This is a Nonesuch Records discography, organized by catalog number.

Catalog number legend
71xxx = Nonesuch
72xxx = Explorer Series
73xxx = Multiple Sets
7-xx = Special Albums
78xxx = Silver Series
79xxx = Digital Series
Following the five-digit 79xxx series, Nonesuch begins a non-sequential, six-digit numbering system

Discography

Nonesuch
H 71001 CLAUDE LE JEUNE; Chants de Is Renaissance
h 71002 THE BAROQUE TRUMPET Corelli, Purcell, etc.
H 71003 HANDEL: The Dettingen Te Deum
H 71004 AN 18th-CENTURY CONCERT Bach, Telemann, Vivaldi, etc.
H 71005 ALBINONI: Adagio for Strs & Organ; 3 Ctos
h 71006 HINDEMITH: Str Qt No 2/MALIPIERO: Rispetti e strambotti
h 71007 RAVEL/DEBUSSY Str Qts
h 71008 BACH: "Coffee" Cantata, BWV 211; "Peasant" Cantata, BWV 212
h 71009 SYMPHONIES & FANFARES FOR THE KING'S SUPPER
h 71010 MASTERPIECES OF THE EARLY FRENCH & ITALIAN RENAISSANCE
H 71011 BACH: Magnificat in D, BWV 243; Cantata, BWV 51
H 71012 COURT & CEREMONIAL MUSIC OF THE EARLY 16th CENTURY
H 71013 HANDEL: 4 Concertos with Oboe & Str Orch
H 71014 THE LEGACY OF THE MANNHEIM SCHOOL
H 71015 HAYDN: Sym No. 6 (Morning); No. 7 (Noon), No. 8 (Night)
H 71016 MUSIC FROM THE CHAPEL OF PHILIP If OF SPAIN
h 71017 STdLZEL/TELEMANN: Concertos
h 71018 VIVALDI: Concertos; Suite
H 71019 BACH: 4 Ctos for Harpsichords & Orch
H 71020 FRENCH ORGAN MASTERPIECES OF THE 17th & 18th CENTURIES
H 71021 MONTEVERDI: Lamento d'Arianna/Lagrime d'amante/Ecco Silvio
H 71022 VIVALDI: Concertos
H 71023 RAMEAU: La Guirlande
H 71024 HAYDN: Cto for Organ; 2 Nocturnes; Sinf Concertante
H 71025 BEETHOVEN: Trio, Op 87; Sextet, Op 71 (Winds)
H 71026 O GREAT MYSTERY
H 71027 PURCELL: Sonata for Tpt; Suites; Pieces for Harpsichord
H 71028 MOZART: Cto for 2 Pianos, K. 365; Cto for 3 Pianos, K. 242
H 71029 BACH: Cantatas, BWV 140 & 57
h 71030 IBERT/GLAZOUNOV/VILLA-LOBOS Works for Saxophone, Ch Orch
H 71031 HAYDN: Sym No 31 (Hornsignal), No. 19, No. 45 (Farewell)
H 71032 HAYDN: Sym No 49 (La Passions), No. 44 (Trauer), Armida Overture
H 71033 POULENC: Sonatas for Clar & Oboe; Aubade
H 71034 C.P.E. BACH: 6 Sonatas for Flute & Harpsichord
h 71035 MOZART: String Quartets, K. 575 & K. 499
H 71036 FRENCH DANCES OF THE RENAISSANCE
H 71037 F. COUPERIN: Harpsichord Works
H 71038 TELEMANN: Works for Flute & Harpsichord
H 71039 CEREMONIAL MUSIC OF THE FRENCH BAROQUE
H 71040 CHARPENTIER: Music for Port-Royal; First Tenebrae Lesson
H 71041 MOZART: Coronation Mass, K. 317; Vesperae Solennes, K. 339
H 71042 VIVALDI: 6 Ctos for Flute, Strings, Continue
H 71043 PERGOLESI: La Serva Padrona
H 71044 SCHUMANN: KonzertstOcke (4 Hns & Orch, Op 86; Piano & Orch, Op 92)
H 71045 HAYDN: Sonatas for Flute & Piano
H 71046 MOZART: Divertimento in B flat for Hns & Strs, K. 287
H 71047 MOZART: Sym No 40, K. 550; Sym in D (aft Ser No 9, Posthorn, K. 320)
H 71048 TINCTORIS: Missa Trium Vocum
H 71049 HAYDN: Divertimenti for Baryton, Via, Cello
H 71050 SHOSTAKOVICH/R. STRAUSS: Sonatas for Cello & Piano
H 71051 MUSIC FROM THE CHAPEL OF CHARLES V
H 71052 VIVALDI/A. SCARLATTI/TELEMANN/GEMINIANI: Concerti Grossi
H 71053 LASSO: Prophetiae sibyllarum; Missa Ecce nune
H 71054 BEETHOVEN. Quintet for Piano & Winds, Op 16; Wind Octet, Op 103
H 71055 MOZART: Sym No 23, K. 181; No 29, K. 201; No 30, K. 202
H 71056 MOZART: Vln Ctos, No 3, K. 216; No 4, K. 218
H 71057 BACH: Ctos (3 Vlns, aft BWV 1064; Fl, Vln, Hps, BWV 1044)
H 71058 MUSIC FROM THE COURT OF BURGUNDY
H 71059 MOZART: Piano Ctos, No 18, K. 456; No 24, K. 491
H 71060 BACH: Metals, BWV 227, 229, 226
H 71061 TELEMANN: Sonatas & Trios
H 71062 SCHOTZ: Metals from Cantiones sacrae (1625)
H 71063 RAMEAU: Pieces de clavecin an concert (1741)
H 71064 BAROQUE MUSIC FOR RECORDERS
H 71065 TELEMANN: Chamber Music with Recorder
H 71066 TELEMANN: 4 Ctos (Tpt; Hns; Oboe d'amore; Vln)
H 71067 HAYDN- 2 Ctos for Flute, Oboe, & Orch (Nos 1 & 5)
H 71068 MOZART: Concertone for 2 Vlns, K. 190; Symph Concertante, K. 297b
H 71069 JAZZ GUITAR BACH
H 71070 VIVALDI: The Four Seasons
H 71071 HAYDN/BOCCHERINI: Cello Concertos
H 71072 MOZART: Piano Ctos, No 20, K. 466; No 23, K. 488
h 71073 LITURGICAL MUSIC FROM THE RUSSIAN CATHEDRAL
H 71074 MOZART: Clarinet Cto, K. 622; Sinf Concertante, K. 364
H 71075 MILITARY FANFARES, MARCHES, & CHORUSES FROM THE TIME OF NAPOLEON
H 71076 J. STAMITZ: Sym in A/MOZART: Divertimento in D, K. 136
H 71077 VIVALDI: Concertos; Sonatas (Wind Quartet)
H 71078 TELEMANN: Suites; Concertos (Ch Orch)
H 71079 MOZART: Sym No 35 (Haffner), K. 385; No 38 (Prague), K. 504
H 71080 MUSIC OF THE FRENCH BAROQUE
H 71081 CHORAL SONGS OF THE ROMANTIC ERA
H 71082 CHARPENTIER: Christmas Oratorio
H 71083 HAYDN: Sym No 26 (Lamentatione), No 12, No 83 (La Poule)
H 71084 ISAAC: Missa Carminum/DESPREZ: Ave Christe/LASSO: Motels
H 71085 TRIO SONATAS OF THE LATE BAROQUE
H 71086 LAUDARIO 91 D1 CORTONA (The Nativity/The Passion)
H 71087 BERWALD: Sym in G min (86rieuse); Sym in C (Singuli6re)
H 71088 VIVALDI: Cantatas, Sonatas
H 71089 ROSSINI: Sine of My Old Age (excerpts)
H 71090 MONTEVERDI. 11 Combattimento di Tancredi e Clorinds,
H 71091 THE SPLENDOR OF BRASS
H 71092 MONTEVERDI: 11 Bello delle Ingrate
H 71093 STRAVINSKY: The Rite of Spring; 4 Eludes for Och
H 71094 D. SCARLATTI: 16 Sonatas for Harpsichord
H 71095 RENAISSANCE CHORAL MUSIC FOR CHRISTMAS
H 71006 HAYDN: Sym No 39, No 3, No 73 (La Chasse)
H 71097 RENAISSANCE VOCAL MUSIC
H 71098 FOUR CENTURIES OF MUSIC FOR THE HARP
H 71099 MENDELSSOHN: Cto for 2 Pianos & Orch; Fair Melusina Overture
H 71100 MASTER WORKS FOR ORGAN, Vol 1
H 71101 HAYDN: Syrn No 21, No 48 (Maria Theresia), No 82 (L'Ours)
H 71102 MOZART: Divertimento for String Trio in E flat, K. 563
H 71103 CALDARA: Cantatas; Madrigal; Canons
H 71104 VIVALDI: 5 Concertos for Diverse Instruments
H 71105 MASTER WORKS FOR ORGAN, Vol 2
H 71106 HAYDN: Sym No 54, No 34, No 75
H 71107 BACH: Sonatas for Cello & Harpsichord, BWV 1027, 1028, 1029
H 71108 DANZI: 3 Woodwind Quintets
H 71109 TELEMANN: Water Music; Cto for 3 Violins & Strings
H 71110 MASTER WORKS FOR ORGAN, Vol 3
H 71111 RENAISSANCE MUSIC FOR BRASS
H 71112 MOZART: 6 Preludes & Fugues for Str Trio, K. 404a
h 71113 BERWALD: Piano Quintets, Nos 1 & 2
H 71114 QUARTET MUSIC OF THE 17th & 18th CENTURIES
H 71115 THE DOVE DESCENDING
H 71116 THE PLEASURES OF CERVANTES
H 71117 18th-CENTURY ITALIAN HARPSICHORD MUSIC
H 71118 ROYAL BRASS MUSIC
H 71119 MASTERS OF THE HIGH BAROQUE
H 71120 IN A MEDIEVAL GARDEN
H 71121 HAYDN: Sym No 13 No 64, No 29
H 71122 MILHAUD: Le Boeuf sur le toit; La Creation du monde
H 71123 COURT & CHAMBER MUSIC OF THE 18th CENTURY
H 71124 TELEMANN: Concerto; Ouverture; Trio
H 71125 C. STAMITZ: 4 Qts for Winds & Strings
H 71126 MOZART: Ctos for Flute, K. 313, K. 314; Andante in C, K. 315
H 71127 HANDEL: Water Music (complete)
H 71128 PRAETORIUS: Christmas Music; Dances/SCHEIN 2 Suites
H 71129 BACH: Sinfonie, BWV 1046a, 152, 156, 42, 209, 76, 75
H 71130 LOUIS XIII: Ballet, Chanson, Diminutions, Psalms/CHARPENTIER: Messe
H 71131 HAYDN: Sym No 35, No 43 (Mercury), No 80
H 71132 TELEMANN: Ctos for Tpts & Oboes; Ouverture in C
H 71133 STRAVINSKY: Les Noces; Pribaoutki; Berceuses du Chat; other works
H 71134 MONTEVERDI: Magnificat/SCHOTZ: Deutsches Magnificat; Saul, Saul; Psalm 2
H 71135 DE FALLA: Cto for Hps & 5 Instrs; Piano Works
H 71136 BACH: Cantatas, BWV 199 & 209
H 71137 BACH: Lute Music, BWV 996, 999, 1000,1006a, 1007
H 71138 DEMANTIUS: St. John Passion; Prophecy
H 71139 BRUCKNER: Sym No 7 in E (orig version)
H 71140 ELGAR/SIBELIUS: String Quartets
H 71141 A BOUQUET OF OLD VIENNA DANCES
H 71142 BACH: Cantatas, BWV 169 & 56
H 71143 HAYDN: Piano Sonatas Nos 20, 23, 52
H 71144 BACH: 2- & 3-part Inventions (complete)
H 71145 BAROQUE FANFARES & SONATAS FOR BRASS
H 71146 BATTLE MUSIC
H 71147 BACH: "Hunting" Cantata, BWV 208
H 71148 VIRTUOSO WIND CONCERTOS
H 71149 HINDEMITH: Die Serenaclen; Martinslied; Violin Sonata; Duet
H 71150 MASTER WORKS FOR ORGAN, Vol 4 (Works by Frangois & Louis Couperin)
H 71151 GEMINIANI: The Enchanted Forest/LOCATELLI: If Pianto d'Arianna
H 71152 BEETHOVEN: String Quartets, Op 18, nos 5 & 6
H 71153 MASQUE MUSIC
H 71154 HAYDN: The Seven Last Words of Christ (Orig, Orch version)
H 71155 RACIMANINOFF: Sonata for Piano & Cello, Op 19 KODALY: Sonata for Cello & Piano, Op 4
H 71156 SYMPHONIES FOR KING$ Kraus: Sym in C min/Brunetti: Sym No 23 in F
H 71157 STOCKHAUSEN: Momente
H 71158 FAURI: Requiem
H 71159 HANDEL: Tu fedel, tu costante/BOISMORTIER: Diane et Action
H 71160 SCHOTZ: Concertos from Symphoniae sacrae, Book 1 (1629)
H 71161 MUSIC FOR THE CLASSIC GUITAR
H 71162 G.-B. SAMMARTINI: 5 Symphonies
H 71163 ROSSINI: Sins of My Old Age (piano excerpts)
H 71164 HANDEL: Harp Cto; Ballet Music "Terpsichore"; 3 Flute Sonatas
H 71165 J. C. BACH: 2 Sinfonias; Sinfonia Concertante in C
H 71166 BACH: Cantata BWV 201, "Der Streit zwischen Phoebus und Pan"
H 71167 DOWLAND: Songs & Ayres
H 71168 HAYDN: Sym No 77, No 61
H 71169 IVES: Piano Sonata No 1
H 71170 MASTER WORKS FOR ORGAN, Vol 5
H 71171 VOICES OF THE MIDDLE AGES (Music from the Gothic Cathedral)
H 71172 BIBER: Six Sonatas for 2 Tpts, Strings & Continuo
H 71173 HAYDN: Mass in D minor (Nelson Mass)
H 71174 SUBOTNICK: Silver Apples of the Moon (For Electronic Music Synthesizer)
H 71175 BARTOK: Music for Piano
H 71176 BACH: Partitas for Harpsichord
H 71177 SCHOTZ: Italian Madrigals
H 71178 FAURE: Ballade for Piano & Orch, Op 19/Pelleas et Melisande (Suite from the Incidental Music), Op 80
H 71179 ROSSINI: 3 Sonatas for Strings (Nos 1, 6 & 5)
H 71180 C.P.E. BACH: 4 Orchestral Symphonies, Wq 183
H 71181 THE PLAY OF HEROD (A 12th-Century Christmas Drama)
H 71182 TELEMANN: Cantata, "Machet die Tore Weit"/BACH: Cantata BWV 151, "Süsser Trost, mein Jesus kommt"
H 71183 BIZET: Symphony in C; Jeux d'Enfants; Patrie Overture
H 71184 MACHAUT: Notre Dame Mass; Gregorian Proper
H 71185 HAYDN: Concertos for Violin, nos I & 3
H 71186 SCHOENBERG: Ode to Napoleon Buonaparte, Op 41/WEBERN: String Quartet, Op 28/STRAVINSKY: 3 Pieces; Concertino for Str Quartet
H 71187 BACH: Cantata BWV 206, "Schleicht, spielende Wellen"
H 71188 MASTERWORKS FOR ORGAN, Vol 6 (Works of Buxtehude)
H 71189 DEBUSSY: Iberia (images pour orchestra, No. 2)/ALBENIZ: Suite from Iberia (Arbos orchestration)
H 71190 TELEMANN: 4 Cantatas from "Harmonischer Gottesdienst"
H 71191 HAYDN: Symphonies, Nos 90 & 91
H 71192 SCHOENBERG: 5 Pieces for Orchestra, Op IS/WEBERN: Cantata No 1, Op 29/STRAVINSKY: Dumbarton Oaks Cto for Ch Orch
H 71193 WERNER: The Curious Musical-Instrument Calendar
H 71194 MOZART: Serenade No 4, K. 203/3 Marches, K. 408
H 71195 FIELD: Nocturnes for Piano
H 71196 SCHÜTZ: Symphoniae sacrae: Concertos from Book 11 (1647)
H 71197 HAYDN: Overture to an English Opera; Syrn No 63 (La Roxolane), No 78
H 71198 RUDIN: Tragoedia, for Electronic Music Synthesizer
H 71199 GABURO: Music for Voices, Instruments & Electronic Sounds
H 71200 YANKEE ORGAN MUSIC
H 71201 XENAKIS: Akrata; Pithoprakta/PENDERECKI: Capriccio for Vln & Orch; De natura sonoris
H 71202 CAGE: Concerto for Prepared Piano & Ch Orch/FOSS: Baroque Variations
H 71203 SIBELIUS: 4 Legends from "The Kalevala," Op 22
H 71204 STUDENT MUSIC IN 17th-CENTURY LEIPZIG
H 71205 R. STRAUSS: Sonata in E flat for Vln & Pno, Op 18/RESPIGHI: Sonata in B min for Vln & Pno
H 71206 BACH: Cantata BWV 215
H 71207 MOZART: 3 Divertimentos, K. 136, 137, 138; 6 Country Dances, K. 606
H 71208 SUBOTNICK: The Wild Bull, for Electronic Music Synthesizer
H 71209 IVES: Songs/GOEHR: 4 Songs from the Japanese/SCHURMANN: Chuench'i
H 71210 WIDOR: Organ Symph No 5 in F min, Op 42, No 1
H 71211 SCHUBERT: Die schöne Müllerin, D. 795
H 71212 STRAVINSKY: Music for Piano
H 71213 MUSIC AT DROTTNINGHOLM: 18th Century Music in the Royal Swedish Court & Theater
H 71214 MASTER WORKS FOR ORGAN, Vol 7
H 71215 MUSSORGSKY: Songs & Dances of Death; 7 Songs
H 71216 DESPREZ: Missa Ave maris stella; 4 Motets
H 71217 THE ART OF THE BAROQUE TRUMPET
H 71218 BERWALD: Overtures & Tone Poems
H 71219 SPECTRUM: New American Music, Vol I
H 71220 SPECTRUM: New American Music, Vol II
H 71221 SPECTRUM: New American Music, Vol III
H 71222 AMERICAN BRASS MUSIC
H 71223 ERB: Music for Instruments & Electronic Sounds
H 71224 CAGE & HILLER: HPSCHD, for Harpsichords & Tapes/JOHNSTON: String Quartet No 2
H 71225 WUORINEN: Time's Encomium, for Synthesized & Processed Synthesized Sound
H 71226 BACH: Cantata BWV213
H 71227 MANDOLIN MUSIC by Beethoven & Hummel
H 71228 GYPSY SONGS by Brahms & Schumann
H 71229 THE BAROQUE LUTE
H 71230 SCHUBERT: Syrn No I in D, D. 82; No 2 in B flat, D. 125
H 71231 SALZMAN: The Nude Paper Sermon, for Actor, Renaissance Consort, Chorus, Electronics
H 71232 A NONESUCH CHRISTMAS from the Baroque, Renaissance, and Middle Ages. liner notes by Joshua Rifkin. Cover art by Abe Gurvin, art director William S. Harvey
H 71233 SPANISH MUSIC FOR THE CLASSIC GUITAR
H 71234 CARTER: Sonata for Cello & Piano; Sonata Ob, Cello & Hps
H 71235 SCHÜTZ: Psalmen Davids: 5 Ctos for Choruses & Instruments (1619)
H 71236 NIELSEN: Symphony No 5, Op 50; Saga-D
H 71237 THE CONTEMPORARY CONTRABASS: New American Music by Cage, Johnston, Oliveros
H 71238 HANDEL: Sonatas for Violin & Continuo, Op 1, Nos 3, 10, 12, 13, 14, 15
H 71239 BARTOK: Concerto for Viola & Orc/HINDEMITH: "Der Schwanendreher" for Viola & Orch
H 71240 MAHLER: Symphony No 1 in D
H 71241 MASTER WORKS FOR ORGAN, Vol 8
H 71242 PRAETORIUS: Polychoral Christmas Music
H 71243 BACH: "Shepherd Cantata," BWV 249a
H 71244 MOZART: Sym No 21 in A, K. 134; No 27 in G, K. 199
H 71245 COMPUTER MUSIC: Works by Randall, Vercoe, Dodge
H 71246 XENAKIS: Electro-Acoustic Music
H 71247 BUSNOIS: Chansons
H 71248 JOPLIN: Piano Rags
H 71249 CARTER: String Quartets, Nos 1 & 2
H 71250 EARTH'S MAGNETIC FIELD: Realizations in Electronic Sound
H 71251 SCHOENBERG: Pierrot Lunaire, Op 21
H 71252 MASTER WORKS FOR ORGAN, Vol 9
H 71253 DRUCKMAN: Animus III; synapse/Valentine
H 71254 MENDELSSOHN: Sym No 3, Op 56 ("Scotch")
H 71255 CRUMB: Ancient Voices of Children
H 71256 BACH: Cantatas, BWV 68 & 172
H 71257 HELIOTROPE BOUQUET: Piano Rags 1900-1970 (William Bolcom)
H 71258 BUXTEHUDE: Four Solo Cantatas
H 71259 MAHLER: Symphony No 4
H 71260 NEW MUSIC FOR ORGAN Bolcom: Black Host/Albright: Organbook 11
H 71261 DESPREZ: Chansons, Frottole & Instrumental Pieces
H 71262 DVORAK: Symphony No 8 in G, Op 88
H 71263 WUORINEN: Chamber Cto for Cello & 10 Players; Ringing Changes for Percussion Ensemble
H 71264 JOPLIN: Piano Rags, Vol 2
H 71265 LOUIS & FRANCOIS COUPERIN: Pieces de Clavecin (Fuller)
H 71266 SOUSA: Marches (Czech Brass Orchestra)
H 71267 FOERSTER: Symphony No. 4
H 71268 Songs by Stephen Foster
H 71269 VARESE: Offrandes, Integrales, Octandre, Ecuatorial
H 71270 TRUMPET CONCERTOS by Hertel, L. Mozart, Hummel
H 71271 DVORAK: Symphonic Variations, opus 78; Scherzo opus 66; Notturno opus 40
H 71272 AMOROUS DIALOGUES OF THE RENAISSANCE
H 71273 BACH: Cantatas BWV 84 and 49
H 71274 BAROQUE TRUMPET RECITAL. Music by Cazzati, Fontana, Marini, Telemann
H 71275 THE NEW TRUMPET. Works for Trumpet with Tape and Piano
H 71276 EARLY AMERICAN VOCAL MUSIC
H 71277 NENNA: Madrigals, Motets and instrumental pieces
H 71278 RAMEAU: Pieces de clavecin
H 71279 BAROQUE MASTERPIECES FOR TRUMPET AND ORGAN. Suite of Trumpet Voluntaries in D (Greene & Boyce)
H 71280 RUTH CRAWFORD SEEGER: String Quartet/PERLE: Quartet No. 5/BABBITT: Quartet No. 2
H 71281 WEILL: Kleine Dreigroschenmusik/MILHAUD: La creation du monde
H 71282 ZELENKA: Lamentations Jeremiae Prophetae
H 71283 GEORGE ROCHBERG: Quartet No. 3
H 71284 Piano Music by George Gershwin (William Bolcom)
H 71285 DAVIES: Eight Songs for a Mad King
H 71286 VECCHI: L'Amfiparnaso
H 71287 RAFF: Symphony No. 5
H 71288 JANACEK: Music for Male Chorus
H 71289 MUSIC FOR FLUTE AND TAPE
H 71290 BAROQUE MASTERPIECES for Trumpet and Organ, Vol. 2
H 71291 PERCUSSION MUSIC. Works by Varese, Colgrass, Cowell, Saperstein, Oak
H 71292 MUSIC IN HONOR OF ST. THOMAS OF CANTERBURY
H 71293 GEORGE CRUMB: Makrokosmos, Vol. 1
H 71294 HANDEL: Wedding Anthem "Sing Unto God"/BACH: Cantata BWV 131
H 71295 DAVIES: Vesalii Icones
H 71296 WOLF: Songs from "Spanisches Liederbuch"
H 71297 WILLIAM BOLCOM: Frescoes
H 71298 CORNET FAVORITES
H 71299 WILLIAM BOLCOM: Pastimes & Piano Rags
H 71301 A FESTIVAL OF TRUMPETS (The New York Trumpet Ensemble)
H 71302 NEW AMERICAN MUSIC VOL. IV: Stefan Wolpe: Quartet for trumpet, tenor sax, percussion & piano; George Rochberg: Blake songs; Jeff Jones: Ambiance (Contemporary Chamber Ensemble - Dir.: Arthur Weisberg)
H 71303 SPECTRUM: NEW AMERICAN MUSIC, VOLUME V (The Contemporary Chamber Ensemble)
H 71304 JOAN MORRIS & WILLIAM BOLCOM: After The Ball
H 71305 JOSHUA RIFKIN: Piano Rags by Scott Joplin, Vol. 3
H 71306 CHARLES IVES: String Quartets Nos. 1 & 2
H 71307 STRAUSS: Death and Transfiguration / HINDESMITH: Symphony, Mathis der Maler(London Symphony Orchestra)
H 71308 WORCESTER FRAGMENTS (Accademia Monteverdiana; Stevens)
H 71309 SCHOENBERG: Piano Works (Paul Jacobs)
H 71310 FRANCK: Chorales for Organ (Murray, T.)
H 71311 GEORGE CRUMB: Music for a Summer Evening (Makrokosmos III)
H 71312 PLAINCHANT & POLYPHONY (Schola Antiqua; Blackley)
H 71314 ELLIOT CARTER: Double Concerto, Duo for Violin & Piano
H 71315 MEDIEVAL CHRISTMAS (Boston Camerata; Cohen)
H 71316 MILHAUD: Piano Music (William Bolcom)
H 71317 HENRY CLAY WORK: Who Shall Rule This American Nation? Songs of the Civil War Era (The Camerata Chorus of Washington)
H 71319 WUORINEN: String Trio / Bearbeitungen uber das Glogauer Liederbuch / Grand Bamboula (Members of Speculum Musicae; The Light Fantastic Players)
H 71320 SCHUBERT: Songs / SCHOENBERG: The Book of the Hanging Gardens (DeGaetani; Kalish)
H 71321 BACH, J. S.: Organ Works (Heintze)
H 71322 DEBUSSY: Etudes (Jacobs)
H 71323 MOZART: Cassation #1 in D, K 100/62a (Russell Davies; Saint Paul Chamber)
H 71324 BOLCOM: Open House / Commedia (The Saint Paul Chamber Orchestra)
H 71325 IVES: Songs (DaGaetani & Kalish)
H 71326 THE PLEASURES OF THE ROYAL COURTS (Various Artists)
H 71330 VAUDEVILLE: Songs of the Great Ladies of The Musical Stage
H 71331 SCHOENBERG: Serenade for Seven Instruments & Bass Voice, Op. 24 (The Light Fantastic Players)
H 71332 BUXTEHUDE: Cantatas
H 71335 SCHUBERT: Mass No. 5 in A Flat (The Saint Paul Chamber Orchestra)
H 71336 OCKEGHEM: Missa Ma maistress (Pomerium Musices; Blachly)
H 71337 IVES: Piano Sonata No. 2, "Concord" (Gilbert Kalish)
H 71339 HANDEL: Sonatas for Oboe & Continuo, Op.1 / Trio Sonatas for 2 Oboes & Continuo (Roseman; Brewer; MacCourt; Eddy; Brewer)
H 71340 BEETHOVEN: Folksong Settings (Accademia Monteverdiana; Stevens)
H 71341 COUSINS: Polkas, Waltzes & Other Entertainments for Cornet & Trombone (Schwarz; Barron; Cooper; Dean ; Gould; Bolter; Edelman)
H 71344 HAYDN: Piano Music Volume III (Gilbert Kalish)
H 71345 WILLAERT: Motets (Boston Camerata; Rifkin)
H 71350 CZECH MUSIC FOR VIOLIN: Janacek / Dvorak / Smetana (Luca; Schoenfield)
H 71351 NEW AMERICAN MUSIC FOR CHAMBER ENSEMBLE: Heiss / Shifrin / Lansky (The Boston Musica Viva)
H 71352 TELEMANN: Music for Wind Instruments
H 71354 SING WE NOEL (Boston Camerata)
H 71355 RAVEL: Chansons madecasses, Sonata (de Gaetani; Dunkel; Anderson; Kalish)
H 71356 BAROQUE MASTERPIECES FOR TRUMPET & ORGAN VOLUME III (Tarr; Kent; Ullrich; Apostle)
H 71358 JOAN MORRIS & WILLIAM BOLCOM: Songs by Ira & George Gershwin
H 71360 RIVERS OF DELIGHT: Folk Hymns from the Sacred Harp (Various Artists)
H 71362 HAYDN: Piano Music Volume IV (Gilbert Kalish)
H 71363 DOWLAND: The Most High and Mighty Christianus the Fourth, King of Denmark, His Galliard, and other lute works by Dowland and Byrd (Paul O'Dette)
H 71364 SCHUMANN: Duets (DaGaetani & Kalish)
H 71365 DEBUSSY: Images (Jacobs, P.)
H 71367 DUFAY: Missa Ecce ancilla domini (Pomerium Musices; Blachly)
H 71368 BERLIOZ: Symphonie funebre et triomphale (Dondeyne)
H 71369 CHRISTMAS IN ANGLIA: Early English Music for Christmastide (Ensemble For Early Music; Frederick Renz, director)
H 71370 SCHUBERT: Music for Violin & Piano (Luca; Kalichstein)
H 71377 BEETHOVEN: Sonatas; MOZART: Rondos (Malcolm Bilson)
H 71378 TALLIS: Mass (Puer Natus Est) (Clerkes of Oxenford; Wulstan)
H 71385 BAROQUE BRASS FESTIVAL. Music of Gabrieli, Locke, Biber, Scheidt, Speer, Guami, and Lappi (Edward Tarr Brass Ensemble)
H 71386 FRANZ SCHUBERT: Sonata in C Major, Drei Klavierstücke (Gilbert Kalish)
H 71387 THE SILVER SWAN and other Elizabethan and Jacobean Madrigals. The Scholars
H 71388 C.P.E. BACH: Flute Concerto in D Minor; FRANZ HOFFMEISTER: Flute Concerto No. 8 in D Major
H 71389 MUSIC OF THE RENAISSANCE VIRTUOSI. James Tyler
H 71390 ECOS D'ESPANA. Guitar Music of Spain (Carlos Bonell)
H 71391 ORLANDO GIBBONS. Church Music of Jacobean England Volume II
H 71392 LA MANIOVANA. Italian Airs & Dances of the Earley Baroque
H 71393 THE VIRTUOSO RECORDER
H 71394 SIR WILLIAM WALTON. Symphony No. 1 in B-Flat Minor
H 71395 D'ANGLEBERT-LULLY: Pieces de Clavecin
H 71396 JOHN SHEPPARD: "Cantate" Mass; Reponsory; "Spiritus Sanctus"
H 71397 DVORAK: Trio for Piano #3 in f, opus 65 (Raphael Trio)
H 71398 ALESSANDRO SCARLATTI: Vespers of Saint Cecilia
H 71399 MACDOWELL: First Modern Suite; Sonata No. 4 (Fierro)
H 71400 ROBERT WHITE: Lamentations of Jeremiah (Clerkes of Oxenford; Wulstan)
H 71401 STRAVINSKY BALLETS. Apollo; Orpheus
H 71402 PARIS, A NOUS DEUX. Music of Francaix, Pierné, & Rivier (Netherlands Saxophone Quartet)
H 71403 GUITAR MUSIC OF THE BAROQUE (Carlos Bonell)
H 71404 BACH: Suite in E minor, BWV 996; SCARLATTI: Five Sonatas (Baltazar Benitez)
H 71405 FRANK BRIDGE: Piano Quintet; Phantasie Trio
H 71406 ELGAR: SYMPHONY NO. 2
H 71407 PALESTRINA. Pope Marcellus Mass; Stabat Mater; Three Motets
H 71408 YSAYE. 6 Sontatas for Solo Violin (Charles Castleman)
H 71409 PIANO MUSIC OF CHARLES TOMLINSON GRIFFES (Noel Lee)
H 71410 ALEXANDER GLAZUNOV: Quartet; PIERRE MAX DUBOIS: Quartet; EUGENE BOZZA: Andante and Scherzo (Netherlands Saxophone Quartet)
H 71411 EDWARD MACDOWELL: Woodland Sketches/Sea Pieces Vol II (Charles Fierro)
H 71412 JANACEK: Concertino; PROKOFIEV: Overture on Hebrew Themes; BERWALD: Septet (Amsterdam Nonet)
H 71417 SAYGUN: Concerto for Piano #1 (Onay; Aykal; Turkish Presidential)
H 71420 JOSHUA RIFKIN: Baroque Beatles

Records for children
H 72001 The Red Balloon (adapted from the French film classic by Albert Lamorisse)

Explorer series
H 72002 The Soul of Flamenco. Cuadro Flamenco: Pepa Reyes, Angel Mancheno, Juan Garcia de la Mata, Manolo Leiva
H 72003 The Music of India. S. Balachander, veena; Sivaraman, mridangam
H 72004 Bouzoukee: The Music of Greece. Iordanis Tsomidis, bouzoukee; others
H 72005 The Koto Music of Japan. Master Hagiwara, Master Hatta, Master Kitagawa, Master Kukusui
H 72006 Caledonia! The Macpherson Singers & Dancers of Scotland
H 72007 The Pennywhistlers; Seven Young Women Sing Folksongs from Bulgaria, Czechoslovakia, Hungary, the U.S.A., the U.S.S.R., Yugoslavia
H 72008 Japanese Koto Classics. Shinichi Yuize
h 72009 The Real Mexico in Music and Song. Recorded in the State of Michoacan by Henrietta Yurchenco. E. Ramos & T. Naranjo, harp; R. Acuna, vihuela; J. Bautista, guitar; Vocal Trio Las Hermanas Pulido; Vocal & Instrumental Ensembles
H 72010 A Heritage of Folk Song from Old Russia. Maria Christova, soprano; Dobrynia Choral & Instr Ensemble; D. Salmanoff dir.
H 72011 MUSIC OF BULGARIA. Soloists, Chorus & Orch of the Ensemble of the Bulgarian Republic, Phillips Koutev cond.
H 72012 GEZA MUSIC OF JAPAN. Music from the Kabuki Theater. Leading soloists of Japan
H 72013 THE REAL BAHAMAS IN MUSIC AND SONG. Recorded on location in the Bahamas by Peter K. Siegel and Jody Stecher
H 72014 CLASSICAL MUSIC OF INDIA. Featuring renowned soloists recorded in India by John Levy
H 72015 MUSIC FROM THE MORNING OF THE WORLD (The Balinese Gamelan)
H 72016 THE SOUND OF THE SUN (Steel Band/Trinidad)
H 72017 TAHITI: THE GAUGUIN YEARS. Songs & Dances of Tahiti. Recorded on location by Francis Maziere
H 72018 DHYANAM/MEDITATION. South Indian Vocal Music. K.V. Narayanaswamy, singer; P. Raghu, mridangam; V.V. Subramaniam, violin; S. Balasubramaniam, tambura
H 72019 BHAVALU/IMPRESSIONS. South Indian Instrumental Music. P. Raghu, mridangam; V.V. Subramaniam, violin; K.V. Narayanaswamy, singer; S. Balasubramaniam, tambura
H 72020 FLOWER DANCE: JAPANESE FOLK MELODIES
H 72021 LOS CHIRIGUANOS OF PARAGUAY. Guarani Songs & Dances. Angel Sanabria, singer & guitar; Pablo Vicente Morel, harp
H 72022 KALPANA/IMPROVISATIONS. Instrumental & Dance Music Of India. M. S. Gupta, sarod; L. A. Khan, tabla; T. Ajmani, dancer
HB 72023 RAMNAD KRISHNAN; VIDWAN. Songs of the Carnatic tradition. Ramnad Krishnan, singer; V. Thyagarajan, vin; T. Ranganathan, mridangam; V. Nagarajan, kanjira; P. Srinivasan, tambura (2-rec set)
H 72024 THE PENNYWHISTLERS. A Cool Day and Crooked Corn
H 72025 A BELL RINGING IN THE EMPTY SKY. Japanese Shakuhachi Music. Goro Yamaguchi, shakuhachi
H 72026 VOICES OF AFRICA. High-Life & Other Popular Music. Saka Acquaye & his African Ensemble from Ghana
H 72027 THE TEN GRACES PLAYED ON THE VINA. Music of South India. M. Nageswara Rao, vina; V. Thyagarajan, vln; T. Ranganathan, mridangam; V. Nagarajan, kanjira; P. Srinivasan, tambura
H 72028 GOLDEN RAIN. Balinese Gamelan Music & Ketjak: The Ramayana Monkey Chant. Recorded in Bali by David Lewiston
H 72029 KINGDOM OF THE SUN. Peru's Inca Heritage. Recorded in Peru by David Lewiston
H 72030 SARANGI, THE VOICE OF A HUNDRED COLORS. Instrumental Music of North India. Ram Narayan, sarangi; M. Misra, tabla; S. Cor, tambura
H 72031 THE JASMINE ISLE. Music of the Javanese Gamelan. Recorded in Java by Suryabrata & David Lewiston
H 72032 THE PULSE OF TANAM. Ragas of South India, M. Nageswara Rao, vina
H 72033 FOLK FIDDLING FROM SWEDEN. Traditional Fiddle Tunes from Dalarna, played by Bjorn Stabi & Ole Hjorth
H 72034 A HARVEST, A SHEPHERD, A BRIDE. Village Music of Bulgaria, Collected & produced by Ethel Raim & Martin Koenig
H 72035 INDIAN STREET MUSIC. The Bauls of Bengal
H 72036 IN PRAISE OF OXALA AND OTHER GODS. Black Music of South America. Recorded in Colombia, Ecuador & Brazil by David Lewiston
H 72037 MUSIC FOR THE BALINESE SHADOW PLAY. Recorded in Bali by Robert E. Brown
H 72038 IN THE SHADOW OF THE MOUNTAIN: Bulgarian Folk Music. Songs & Dances of Pirin-Macedonia, collected & produced by Ethel Raim & Martin Koenig
H 72039 THE PERSIAN SANTUR. Music of Iran. Nasser Rastegar-Nejad
H 72040 RAMNAD KRISHNAN: Kaccheri. A concert of South Indian classical music
H 72041 ESCALAY: The Water Wheel. Oud Music of Nubia. Hamza El Din, voice & oud.
H 72042 VILLAGE MUSIC OF YUGOSLAVIA. Collected in Yugoslavia & produced by Martin Koenig
H 72043 THE AFRICAN MBIRA. Music of the Shona people of Rhodesia. Played & sung by Dumisani Abraham Maraire, with Nkosana Arthur Maraire & Sukatai Laura Chiora
H 72044 JAVANESE COURT GAMELAN from the Pura Paku Alaman, Jogyakarta; K.R.T. Wasitodipuro, director. Recorded in Java by Robert E. Brown
H 72045 FIESTAS OF PERU: Music of the High Andes
H 72046 GAMELAN SEMAR PEGULINGAN/Gamelan of the Love God
H 72047 CARIBBEAN ISLAND MUSIC. Songs & Dances of Haiti, the Dominican Republic & Jamaica
H 72048 THE IRISH PIPES OF FINBAR FUREY
H 72049 P'ANSORI. Korea's Epic Vocal Art & Instrumental Music
H 72050 TURKISH VILLAGE MUSIC
H 72051 CHINA: Shantung Folk Music & Traditional Instrumental Pieces
H 72052 PALLAVI. South Indian Flute Music
H 72053 AFGHANISTAN: Music from the Crossroads of Asia
H 72054 THE SOUL OF MBIRA: Traditions of the Shona People of Rhodesia
H 72055 TIBETAN BUDDHISM. Tantras of Gyuto: Mahakala
H 72056 ANIMALS OF AFRICA: Sounds of the Jungle, Plain & Bush
H 72057 MUSIC FROM THE HEART OF AFRICA/BURUNDI
H 72058 KASHMIR: Traditional Songs & Dances
H 72059 IRISH PIPE MUSIC: Hornpipes, Airs & Reels
H 72060 A PERSIAN HERITAGE: Classical Music of Iran
H 72061 MUSIC OF THE KARAKORAMS OF CENTRAL ASIA
H 72062 CLASSICAL MUSIC OF INDIA. Ram Narayan, sarangi
H 72063 AFRICAN CEREMONIAL AND FOLK MUSIC. Recorded in Uganda, Kenya and Tanzania
H 72064 TIBETAN BHUDDISM. Tantras of Gyuto: Sangwa Dupa
H 72065 FESTIVALS OF THE HIMALAYAS. Recorded in Chamba and Kulu
H 72066 AFRICA: Witchcraft and Ritual Music, recorded in Kenya and Tanzania
H 72067 TURKEY: A Musical Journey. Traditional songs, dances, and rituals
H 72068 THE BENGAL MINSTREL: Music of the Bauls
H 72069 KASHMIR. Traditional Songs & Dances Volume II
H 72070 MEXICO: Fiestas of Chiapas and Oaxaca
H 72071 TIBETAN BUDDHISM. Ritual Orchestra & Chants
H 72072 JAPAN. Traditional Vocal & Instrumental Music
H 72073 AFRICA: Drum, chant, and instrumental music recorded in Niger, Mali, and Upper Volta
H 72074 JAVANESE COURT GAMELAN Volume II
H 72075 LADAKH. Songs & Dances from the Highlands of Western Tibet
H 72076 SHAKUHACHI. The Japanese Flute
H 72077 ZIMBABWE: Shona mbira music
H 72078 THE REAL BAHAMAS Volume II
H 72079 FESTIVALS OF THE HIMALAYAS Volume II
H 72080 QAWWALI. Sufi Music of Pakistan (Sabri Brothers)
H 72081 TIBETAN BUDDHISM. A Ghost Excorcism Ritual
H 72082 AFRICA. Ancient Ceremonies, Dance Music & Songs of Ghana
H 72083 JAVANESE COURT GAMELAN Volume III
H 72084 JAPAN. Kabuki & other traditional music
H 72085 FLOATING PETALS... WILD GEESE. THE MOON ON HIGH. Music of the Chinese Pipa
H 72086 NECTAR OF THE MOON. Vichitra Vina Music of Northern India (Dr. Lalmani Misra)
H 72087 SAVANNAH RHYTHMS. Music of Upper Volta
H 72088 ISLAND MUSIC OF THE SOUTH PACIFIC
72089 SPRING NIGHT ON A MOONLIGHT RIVER: Music of the Chinese zither
72090 RHYTHMS OF THE GRASSLANDS. Music of Upper Volta, Volume II
72091 AN ISLAND CARNIVAL. Music of the West Indies
72092 ROMANIAN REFLECTIONS. Village and Urban
72093 SAMUL-NORI. Drums and Voices of Korea

Multiple sets
HB=2-rec set; HC=3-rec set; HD=4-rec set; HE=5-rec set
HE 73001 BACH: Complete Harpsichord Concertos
HB 73002 BEETHOVEN: Missa Solemnis
HB 73003 BRAHMS: German Requiem; Alto Rhapsody; Fast- und Gedenksprache
HC 73004 BACH: St. John Passion, BWV 245
HB 73005 BEETHOVEN: Fidelio
HB 73006 BACH: Brandenburg Concertos, BWV 1046-1051
HB 73007 HINDEMITH: Des Marienleben (New Version, 1948)
HC 73008 BAROQUE MASTERS OF VENICE, NAPLES, & TUSCANY
HC 73009 HAYDN: Die Jahreszeiten (The Seasons), Oratorio
HB 73010 MUSIC OF SHAKESPEARE'S TIME
HC 73011 HAYDN: The 6 "Paris" Symphonies (Nos. 82-87)
HB 73012 SCHÜTZ: Kleine geistliche Konzerte, Bock 1 (1636)
HB 73013 BACH: The Art of Fugue, BWV 1080
HC 73014 MUSIC AT THE COURTS: Italy, Sweden & France (16th to 18th Centuries)
HD 73015 BACH: Orgelbachlein, BWV 599-644 (with Cantata Chorales & other Chorale Settings)
HB 73016 THE TRIUMPH OF MAXIMILIAN I (Music of the 15th & 16th Centuries)
HB 73017 BACH: Sonatas for Vln & Hps, BWV 1014-1019
HC 73018 THE NONESUCH GUIDE TO ELECTRONIC MUSIC (2-rec set)
HF 73019 HAYDN: The 12 "London" Symphonies (Nos 93-104)
HC 73020 BACH: Masses, BWV 233-236
HD 73021 BACH: St. Matthew Passion, BWV 244
HB 73022 BERLIOZ: L'Enfance du Christ
HB 73023 MAHLER: Symphony No 3
HD 73024 SCHÜTZ: Kleine geistliche Konzerte, Book II
HB 73025 CHARLES IVES: 4 Sonatas for Violin & Piano; Largo
HB 73027 J.C.F. BACH: 7 Symphonies (Cologne Chamber Orchestra)
HB 73028 TWENTIETH-CENTURY FLUTE MUSIC (Sollberger)
HB 73030 JOHANN SEBASTIAN BACH: The Sonatas & Partitas for Unaccompanied Violin
HB 73031 CLAUDE DEBUSSY: Preludes for Piano (Paul Jacobs)
HB 73032 MONTEVERDI: Christmas Vespers
HB 73033 HENRY PURCELL: Complete Music for Harpsichord (Robert Woolley)
HB 73034 BRAHMS: The Complete Sonatas for Violin and Piano
73035 SCRIABIN: The Complete Piano Sonatas (Ruth Laredo)

Special albums
H 7-11 NONESUCH EXPLORER: Music from Distant Corners of the World (Treasures of the Explorer Series) (2-rec set)
H 7-12 A BAROQUE FESTIVAL

Silver series
N 78001 Morton Subotnick, A Sky Of Cloudless Sulphur After The Butterfly
N 78002 Music for Winds, Gustav Holst and Ralph Vaughan Williams
N 78003 The Play of Daniel (Lupus Danielis). A Liturgical Drama
N 78004 Mozart: Sonatas #12 and 13 (Bilson)
N 78005 Mozart: Two Duos for Violin and Viola
N 78006 Milton Babbitt, Mell Powell
N 78007 The New Nonesuch Guide to Electronic Music
N 78008 Beethoven's Sonatas
N 78009 Civilization & Its Discontents. A Music Theater Comedy by Michael Sahl and Eric Salzman
NC 78010 Beethoven: Sonata #16, 17, 18, 21, 23, 24, and 26 (Rosen) (3-rec set)
N 78011 George Rochberg: Quintet for Piano and String Quartet
N 78012 Morton Subotnik: Axolotl/The Wild Beasts
N 78013 Mozart: Four-Hand Sonatas, Vol. 1
NB 78014 Hugo Wolf: Italienisches Liederbuch (2-rec set)
N 78015 Beethoven: Septet in E flat, opus 20 (BSO Chamber Players)
78016 Mozart: Sonata in F, K 533/494 (Bilson)
78017 Rochberg: Quartet No. 7; Barber: String Quartet; Dover Beach
78018 Haydn: Two Great E-flat Sonatas (Malcolm Bilson)
78019 The Art of the Mandolin (Emanuil Sheynkman)
78021 Couperin, L.: Suite in g (Kipnis, I.)
78022 Barber, Milhaud, Arnold, Ligeti, Ibert (Barry Tuckwell Wind Quintet)
78024 Stefan Wolpe: Enactments/Second Piece for Violin alone/From here on farther... (performed by "Continuum")
78025 Claude Debussy, Chansons de Bilitis (de Gaetani; Kalish)
78027 Tom Stoppard, The Real Thing (Jeremy Irons & Glenn Close)
78028 Schubert: Sonata #20 in A, D 959 (Goode)

Digital series
D 79001 Los Angeles Chamber Orchestra; Gerard Schwarz, conductor: Schoenberg: Five pieces for orchestra, op. 16 / Chamber symphony, op. 9D 79002 Los Angeles Chamber Orchestra; Gerard Schwarz, conductor: American Music for Strings: Samuel Barber, Irving Fine, Elliott Carter, David DiamondDB 79003 New York City Opera: Kurt Weill: Silverlake: A Winter's Tale (2-rec set)
D 79004 Sequoia String Quartet; Allan Vogel, oboe: Luigi Boccherini: Quartet in A Major; Quintet in D Major; Quintet in D Minor; Quintet in E-flat MajorD 79005 Sequoia String Quartet: Arnold Schoenberg: String Quartet No. 2; Mel Powell: Little Companion PiecesD 79006 Paul Jacobs: Paul Jacobs Plays Blues, Ballads & Rags: American Music for PianoD 79007 Robert Schumann: Sonata in A Minor; Felix Mendelssohn: Sonata in F Major; Clara Schumann: Three Romances
D 79008 Los Angeles Vocal Arts Ensemble: Brahms: Liebeslieder Walzer, Op. 52; Neue Liebeslieder Walzer, Op. 65D 79009 Orpheus Chamber Orchestra: Mozart: Sinfonia Concertante in E-flat MajorD 79010 Igor Kipnis: Soler: Fandango & SonatasD 79011 The Waltz Project: 17 Contemporary Waltzes for PianoD 79012 Sequoia String Quartet; Julius Levine, bass: Antonín Dvořák: Quintet for Strings in G, opus 77D 79013 J.S. Bach: O! holder Tag, erwünschte Zeit. Wedding Cantata BWV 210D 79014 Richard Goode: Schumann: Humoreske, opus 20D 79015 Los Angeles Chamber Orchestra; Gerard Schwarz, conductor: C.P.E. Bach: Concertos for Harpsichord & Strings in A Major, in D MajorD 79016 Kurt Weill, Ernő Dohnányi: Sonatas for Cello and PianoD 79017 Sequoia String Quartet; David Shifrin, clarinet: WeberD 79018 Los Angeles Chamber Orchestra; Gerard Schwarz, conductor: Richard Strauss: Duet-Concertino; Arthur Honegger: Concerto Da CameraD 79019 Teresa Stratas: The Unknown Kurt WeillDB 79020 Igor Kipnis: The Notebook of Anna Magdalena Bach (2-rec set)
DB 79021 Sergiu Luca, violin; Paul Schoenfield, piano; David Shifrin, clarinet: Béla Bartók: The Complete Music for Violin with Piano
D 79022 Musical Offering: Georg Philipp Telemann: A 300th Birthday CelebrationD 79023 Los Angeles Chamber Orchestra; Gerard Schwarz, conductor: Cherubini: Sinfonia in D / Rossini: Grand Overture, Sinfonia (al conventello)D 79024 Paul Jacobs, Joseph Silverstein, American Brass Quintet: Virgil Thomson: A Portrait AlbumD 79025 Boccherini Ensemble: Boccherini: String Quintets Volume OneD 79026 Sequoia String Quartet: Mozart: Four Early QuartetsD 79027 Los Angeles Vocal Arts Ensemble: Rossini: Sins of My Old AgeD 79028 Santa Fe Chamber Music Festival: Schoenberg: Verklärte Nacht; String Trio
D 79029 London Early Music Group; James Tyler, director: Dolce Vita Mia: Italian Music from the High RenaissanceD 79030 The Tango ProjectD 79031 Michael Tree, Richard Goode: Brahms: Viola SonatasD 79032 Ruth Laredo: Barber: Piano Sonata; Souvenirs; NocturneD 79033 Los Angeles Chamber Orchestra; Gerard Schwarz, conductor: Janáček: Idyll / Mladi ("Youth")D 79034 The Odessa Balalaikas: The Art of the Balalaika79035 Virgil Thomson: Four Saints In Three Acts (2 LPs)79036 J.S. Bach: B Minor Mass (2 LPs)
79037 Igor Kipnis: The Virtuoso Handel79038 Paul Jacobs, Ursula Oppens: Stravinsky: The Four-Hand Petrouchka. Three Pieces for String Quartet79039 Calliope: Dances: A Renaissance Revel79040 Sergiu Luca, Rochester Philharmonic; David Zinman, conductor: Spohr: Concerto No. 8; Beethoven: Konzertsatz; Two Romances79041 Ivan Moravec: Janáček79042 Richard Goode & Orpheus Chamber Orchestra: Mozart: Piano Concertos Nos. 17 & 2379043 David Del Tredici: In Memory of a Summer Day79044 Los Angeles Chamber Orchestra; Gerard Schwarz, conductor: Dvořák: Czech Suit, op. 39; Serenade, op. 4479045 Ronald Roseman, Gilbert Kalish, Donald Maccourt, New York Woodwind Quintet: Poulenc: Oboe Sonata; Trio; Sextet79046 Boston Symphony Chamber Players: Schubert: Octet79047 Paul Jacobs: Elliott Carter: Night Fantasies; Piano Sonata79048 Sequoia String Quartet: Prokofiev: String Quartets79049 Carlos Salzedo: Suite of Eight Dances, Short Fantasy on a Noel Provençal, Short Fantasy on a Catalan Carol, Ballade, Scintillation, Traipsin' through Arkansas79050 Tanglewood Festival Chorus; John Oliver, conductor: Weill: Recordare; Dallapiccola: Canti Di Prigionia79051 Bartók: Rhapsody #1; Janáček: Fairy Tale; Prokofiev: Sonata for Cello & Piano in C, opus 11979052 Sergiu Luca, Saint Louis Symphony Orchestra; Leonard Slatkin, conductor: Antonín Dvořák: Violin Concerto; Romance in F Minor; Mazurek in E Minor79053 The Western Wind: An Old-Fashioned Christmas79054 Boccherini Ensemble: Boccherini: String Quintets Volume Two79055 Los Angeles Chamber Orchestra; Hamilton: C.P.E. Bach: Harpsichord Concertos, Vol. II79056 Aston Magna: Vivaldi: Sonatas and Concertos for Two Violins79057 Two to Tango: The Tango Project II79058 William Bolcom: Second Sonata; Duo Fantasy; Graceful Ghost
79061 Paul Jacobs, Ursula Oppens: Busoni: Fantasia contrappuntistica; Beethoven: Fugue for Piano four hands, opus 134 (from opus 133); Mozart: Fantasy for Pianos (2), K 608 (Busoni trans.)79062 Charles Rosen: Schumann: The Revolutionary Masterpieces79064 Richard Goode: Schubert: Sonatas for Piano, D.95879065 Gerard Schwarz and the Los Angeles Chamber Orchestra: Brahms: Serenade No. 179066 Rochester Philharmonic Orchestra: Antonin Dvořák: Legends, Op. 5979067 Musical Offering: Viva Vivaldi79068 BSO Chamber Players: Brahms: String Quintets, Op. 88 and Op. 11179071 The Sequoia String Quartet: Kurt Weill: String Quartets in B minor, No. 179072 Saint Louis Symphony Orchestra: Schwanter: Magabunda / Schuman: American Hymn79078 Rochester Philharmonic Orchestra: JANACEK: Lachian Dances / DVORAK: Suite in A, Op. 98b79101 Steve Reich: The Desert Music79108 George Perle: Serenade No. 3 for Piano and Chamber Orchestra
79109 London Early Music Group: Rossi: Arias; Monteverdi: Arias; Cavalli: Arias; Carissimi: Cantatas79111 Kronos Quartet: Kronos Quartet79112 Bilson Malcolm, Luca Sergiu: Sonata for violin and piano n°36 in F major K.54779113 Philip Glass: Mishima79114 Carol Wincenc: Music of Griffes, Copland, Barber, Del Tredici, Foss, and Cowell
79115 John Adams: Harmonielehre79116 Sérgio & Odair Assad: Latin American Music for Two Guitars79117 Ani & Ida Kavafian: Mozart:Duo / Moszrowski: Suite / Sarasate: Navarra79118 Saint Louis Symphony Orchestra: Rouse: The Infernal Machine / Tower: Sequoia / Erb: Prismatic Variations / Rouse: Ogoun Badagris79120 Joan Morris & William Bolcom: Blue Skies: Songs of Irving Berlin79122 Charles Rosen: Beethoven: Sonatas #12, 13, 14, Bagatelles, opus 11979123 Paul O'Dette: Robin Is To The Greenwood Gone79124 Richard Goode: Schubert: Sonatas for Piano, D96079126 American Strings Quartet: Quartet for Strings No. 9, Op. 34 in D Minor79127 Caetano Veloso: Caetano Veloso 
79129 André Previn with John Harbison and the Pittsburgh Symphony Orchestra, – Ulysses' Bow/Samuel Chapter79131 Teresa Stratas: Stratas Sings Weill79132 John Gibbons: A Bach Recital 
79133 Scott Johnson: John Somebody79134 Boston Camerata; Joel Cohen, conductor:  Renaissance Christmas79135 New York City Ballet Orchestra: A Balanchine Album79136 Robert Irving and the New York City Ballet Orchestra: Agon79137 World Saxophone Quartet: Plays Duke Ellington79138 Steve Reich: Sextet/Six Marimbas79139 John Zorn: The Big Gundown: John Zorn Plays The Music Of Ennio Morricone79143 Joseph Schwantner & Lucy Shelton: A Sudden Rainbow79144 John Adams: The Chairman Dances79145 New York Chamber Symphony, Gerard Schwarz, American String Quartet: Schoenberg: String Quartet Concerto (After Handel) / Strauss: Divertimento, Op. 86 (After Couperin)79146 Ivan Moravec: Piano Music Of Smetana, Korte, Suk (Live In Prague)79147 Stephen Paulus: Symphony in Three Movements / Libby Larsen: Symphony, Water Music79148 Joan Morris & William Bolcom: After The Ball79149 George Crumb: Ancient Voices of Children plus Makrokosmos III79150 Various Artists: Percussion Works79151 William Bolcom: George Gershwin: Piano Music and Songs79152 Anner Bylsma & Malcolm Bilson: Beethoven: Cello Sonatas Nos. 1 & 279153 Stephen Albert: Flower of the Mountain / Into Eclipse79154 Richard Goode: Richard Goode Plays Brahms79155 Sergiu Luca & Malcolm Bilson: Mozart: Sonatas For Fortepiano & Violin, Vol 279156 The Consort Of Musicke: Welcome Every Guest: Songs From John Blow's Amphion Anglicus79157 William Bolcom: Cornet Favorites/Highlights. From "Cousins"79158 Jan DeGaetani & Gilbert Kalish: Foster: Songs Vol. 1 and 279159 Joshua Rifkin: Scott Joplin: Piano Rags79160 Mieczyslaw Horszowski: Mozart/Chopin/Debussy/Beethoven79161 Paul Jacobs: Debussy: Etudes for Piano, Books I & II / En Blanc et Noir, containing En blanc et noir79162 Gilbert Kalish: Haydn: Piano Sonatas Hob. XVI79163 Kronos Quartet: White Man Sleeps79164 World Saxophone Quartet: Dances and Ballads79165 Mystère des Voix Bulgares79167 Various Artists: Dances of the World: Music from the Nonesuch Explorer Series 
79168 BSO Chamber Players: Aaron Copland: Sextet; Piano Variations; Piano Quartet79169 Steve Reich: Early Works79170 Steve Reich: Drumming79171 Various Artists: Late in the 20th Century: An Elektra/Nonesuch New Music Sampler79172 John Zorn: Spillane / Two-Lane Highway / Forbidden Fruit79173 Idjah Hadidjah: Tonggeret79174 Astor Piazzolla: Concierto Para Bandoneon / Tres Tangos79175 Irving Fine: Notturno, Partita, String Quartet, The Hour Glass79176 Steve Reich: Different Trains/Electric Counterpoint (Kronos Quartet, Pat Metheny)
79177 John Adams: Nixon in China79178 Jan DeGaetani & Gilbert Kalish: Songs of America - On Home, Love, Nature and Death79179 Sergio & Odair Assad: Alma Brasileira79180 Ensemble Alcatraz: Visions and Miracles79181 Kronos Quartet: Winter Was Hard79183 Paul Jacobs, Gilbert Kalish, Contemporary Chamber Ensemble; Arthur Weisberg, conductor: Elliott Carter: Sonata for Flute, Oboe Cello & Harpsichord79185 Garrick Ohlsson and the San Francisco Symphony: Wuorinen: Piano Concerto, No. 379186 Scott Jacobs: Patty Hearst: Original Motion Picture Soundtrack79187 Dawn Upshaw: Knoxville: Summer of 191579188 Leon Kirchner: Concerto for Violin, Cello, Winds, Percussion79189 John Harbison: Simple Daylight79191 Bob Telson: Gospel at Colonus79192 Philip Glass: Powaqqatsi
79193 John Adams: Music from Nixon in China79195 Village Music of Bulgaria: In the Shadow of the Mountain79196 Bali: Balinese Explorer Compilation (Explorer Series)
79197 Peru: Kingdom of the Sun - Peru's Inca Heritage (Explorer Series)
79198 Tibet: Tibetan Explorer Compilation (Explorer Series)
79200 Edward Aldwell: J.S. Bach: The Well-Tempered Clavier, Book II79201 Le Mystère des Voix Bulgares, Vol. 279202 Mieczyslaw Horszowski: Mozart/Chopin/Schumann
79203 Portugal: Guitarra Portuguesa / Paredes (Explorer Series)
79204 Bali: Music of Bali (David Lewiston) (Explorer Series)
79205 Akiko Yano: Akiko Yano79209 Philip Glass: The Thin Blue Line79210 Various Artists: Wings of Desire Soundtrack
79211 Richard Goode: Beethoven: The Late Sonatas79212 Richard Goode: Beethoven: The Op. 31 Piano Sonatas79213 Richard Goode: Beethoven: The Op. 10 Piano Sonatas79216 Astor Piazzolla and the New Tango Quintet: La Camorra II79217 Kronos Quartet: Kronos Quartet Plays Terry Riley: Salome Dances for Peace
79218 John Adams: Fearful Symmetries/The Wound-Dresser79219 John Adams: Chamber Symphony/Grand Pianola Music79220 Steve Reich: The Four Sections/Music for Mallet Instruments, Voices & Organ79221 Various Artists: Late In The 20th Century II: New Recordings from Elektra/Nonesuch-Elektra/Musician-Nonesuch Explorer79222 Jan DeGaetani & Contemporary Chamber Ensemble; Arthur Weisberg, conductor: Spectrum: New American Music79224 Rustavi Choir: Georgian Voices79225 Philip Tabane and Malombo: Unh! 
79227 Ingram Marshall: Three Penitential Visions79228 Andrzej Panufnik: Arbor Cosmica / Sinfonia Sacra79229 William Kraft: Contextures II: The Final Beast / Interplay / Of Ceremonies, Pageants and Celebrations
79230 Baltimore Symphony Orchestra: Christopher Rouse: Symphony No. 1 Phantasmanta79231 Alvin Singleton: Shadows / After Fallen Crumbs / A Yellow Rose Petal79232 Mieczyslaw Horszowski: Beethoven/Chopin/Bach79233 Ivan Moravec: Chopin: The Complete Nocturnes79234 Vladimir Viardo: Shostakovich: Twenty-four Preludes, Piano Sonata No. 279235 Various Artists: Imaginary Landscapes: New Electronic Music79236 Anner Bylsma & Malcolm Bilson: Beethoven: Cello Sonatas Vol II79237 Jan DeGaetani & Gilbert Kalish: Schoenberg: Pierrot Lunaire/The Book of the Hanging Gardens79238 John Zorn: Naked City79239 Various Artists: Gipsy Original Soundtrack
79240 Ensemble Alcatraz: Danse Royale79241 Abed Azrie: Aromates79242 Kronos Quartet: Black Angels79243 Michael Feinstein: Michael Feinstein Sings the Burton Lane Songbook, Vol. 179245 Joan Tower: Silver Ladders / Island Prelude / Music for Cello and Orchestra / Sequoia79246 Tobias Picker: Symphony No. 2 / String Quartet No. 179248 Jan DeGaetani, Gilbert Kalish, Paul Jacobs, New York Chamber Symphony of the 92nd Street Y, Gerard Schwarz, conductor: Elliott Carter: The Minotaur79249 John Adams: American Elegies79250 George Gershwin & Ira Gershwin: Girl Crazy79251 Louis Andriessen: De Staat79252 Various Artists: Elektra Nonesuch Sampler79253 Kronos Quartet: Hunting Gathering: Volans79254 Kronos Quartet: Astor Piazzolla: Five Tango Sensations79255 Kronos Quartet: Witold Lutoslawski: String Quartet79256 Ken Burns: The Civil War: Original Soundtrack Recording79257 Henryk Górecki: Already It Is Dusk; Lerchenmusik79258 World Saxophone Quartet: Metamorphosis79259 Sanford Sylvan & David Breitman: Beloved That Pilgrimage: Songs of Barber, Chanler and Copland79260 Kronos Quartet: The Collection79261 Mieczyslaw Horszowski: Bach: English Suite No. 5 In E-Minor BWW 810 / Chopin: Two Nocturnes / Beethoven: Sonata No. 6 In F-Major, Op. 10, No. 279262 Dawn Upshaw: Girl with the Orange Lips - Ravel, de Falla, et al.79263 Jan DeGaetani, Gilbert Kalish: Schubert: Songs; Wolf: Songs from the Spanische Liederbuch79264 Mieczyslaw Horszowski: Bach/Schumann/Chopin79265 Boston Camerata; Joel Cohen, conductor: A Baroque Christmas79267 Various: Wiener - Musik Für Ein Neues Zeitalter79270 John Zorn: Filmworks: 1986-199079271 Richard Goode: Schubert: Sonatas for Piano: D845; D85079272 Edward Aldwell: J.S. Bach: The Well-Tempered Clavier, Book I79273 George Gershwin: Strike Up the Band79274 Michael Feinstein: Michael Feinstein Sings the Jule Styne Songbook79275 Kronos Quartet: Pieces of Africa79277 Caetano Veloso: Circulado79278 Wayne Horvitz: The President: Miracle Mile79279 Akiko Yano: Love Life79280 Don Byron: Tuskegee Experiments79281 John Adams: The Death of Klinghoffer79282 Henryk Górecki: Symphony No. 3 (Dawn Upshaw, London Sinfonietta; David Zinman, conductor)
79283 Vladimir Viardo: Rachmaninoff: Variations on a Theme of Corelli79285 Michael Feinstein: Michael Feinstein Sings the Burton Lane Songbook, Vol. 279286 Philip Glass: Hydrogen Jukebox79287 George Gershwin: Gershwin Plays Gershwin79288 Dawn Upshaw: Henryk Górecki: Symphony No. 379289 Robert Ashley: Improvement: An Opera for Television79290 Giya Kancheli: Symphony No. 579291 Louis Andriessen: De Tijd79292 Sérgio & Odair Assad: Scarlatti, Rameau, Couperin Transcriptions79293 Sanford Sylvan: Schubert: Die schöne Müllerin79294 New York City Ballet Orchestra: The Nutcracker: Original Soundtrack featuring Kevin Kline
79295 Steve Reich: Tehillim79299 Gipsy Kings: Tierra Gitana79300 The Real Bahamas, Vols. 1 & 2 (Explorer Series)
79301 Bill Frisell: Have a Little Faith79303 Boston Camerata; Joel Cohen, conductor: With Joyful Voice79308 George Gershwin & Ira Gershwin: Lady, Be Good79309 World Saxophone Quartet: You Don't Know Me79309 World Saxophone Quartet: Breath of Life79310 Kronos Quartet: Short Stories79311 John Adams: Hoodoo Zephyr79312 Kronos Quartet: Collection II79313 Don Byron: Don Byron Plays the Music of Mickey Katz79314 Michael Feinstein: Sings the Hugh Martin Songbook79315 Michael Feinstein: Sings the Jerry Herman Songbook79316 Bill Frisell: This Land79317 Dawn Upshaw & Richard Goode: Goethe Lieder79318 Kronos Quartet: At the Grave of Richard Wagner79319 Kronos Quartet: Henryk Górecki: String Quartets, Nos. 1 & 279320 Kronos Quartet: Morton Feldman: Piano & String Quartet79323 Philip Glass: Einstein on the Beach79324 Philip Glass: Music in 12 Parts79325 Philip Glass: Music with Changing Parts79326 Philip Glass: Two Pages; Contrary Motion; Music In Fifths; Music In Similar Motion79327 Steve Reich: The Cave79328 Richard Goode: Beethoven: The Complete Sonatas79329 Philip Glass: Anima Mundi79330 Mandy Patinkin: Experiment79331 New York City Ballet Orchestra: Tchaikovsky: The Nutcracker79332 Kronos Quartet: Bob Ostertag: All the Rage79334 Various Artists: Fearless79335 Pokrovsky Ensemble: Les Noces79337 Derek Jarman: Blue79338 George Gershwin & Ira Gershwin: Pardon My English79339 Caetano Veloso & Gilberto Gil: Tropicalia 279340 Ken Burns: Baseball Soundtrack
79341 Dmitry Sitkovetsky: Goldberg Variations79342 Louis Andriessen: De Stijl79345 Dawn Upshaw: I Wish It So79346 Kronos Quartet: Night Prayers79347 Philip Glass: La Belle et la Bete79348 Henryk Górecki: Miserere79349 Le Mystère des Voix Bulgares: Ritual79350 Bill Frisell: Music For The Films Of Buster Keaton: Go West79351 Bill Frisell: Music For The Films Of Buster Keaton: The High Sign/One Week79352 Dawn Upshaw: I Wish It So79353 Jelly Roll Morton: Tom Cat Blues79354 Don Byron: Music for Six Musicians79356 Kronos Quartet: Kronos Quartet Performs Philip Glass: String Quartets 2, 3, 4 and 579357 Fontella Bass: No Ways Tired79358 Gipsy Kings: The Best of the Gipsy Kings79359 John Adams: El Dorado79360 John Adams: Violin Concerto/Shaker Loops79361 George Gershwin & Ira Gershwin: Oh, Kay!79362 Henryk Górecki: Kleines Requiem für eine Polka / Harpsichord Concerto / Good Night79363 Jelly Roll Morton: Piano Rolls79364 Dawn Upshaw: White Moon: Songs to Morpheus79365 Sérgio & Odair Assad: Saga dos Migrantes79366 Robin Holcomb: Little Three79367 Louis Andriessen: De Materie79370 George Gershwin: The Piano Rolls, Vol. 2
79371 Sanford Sylvan: L'Horizon Chimerique79372 Kronos Quartet: Howl U.S.A.79374 Le Mystère des Voix Bulgares: Complete Box Set, Vol. 1-2/Ritual
79375 Various artists: Late Night Concerts79376 Steve Reich and Michael Tilson-Thomas
79377 Philip Glass: Filmworks79382 Javanese Court Gamelan79391 Richard Goode: Beethoven: Piano Sonatas Nos. 21, 22, 2379392 Mandy Patinkin: Oscar and Steve79393 Dawn Upshaw: Portrait79394 Kronos Quartet: Released 1985 - 199579395 Fred Hersch: Passion Flower (Fred Hersch Plays Billy Strayhorn)79399 Gipsy Kings: Tierra Gitana79400 Leonard Bernstein: Leonard Bernstein's New York79401 Bill Frisell: Quartet79402 Leonard Rosenman: East of Eden / Rebel Without a Cause79404 Toru Takemitsu: The Film Music of Toru Takemitsu79405 Georges Delerue: Truffaut Film Music79406 Dawn Upshaw: Sings Rodgers & Hart79407 Gidon Kremer: Hommage à Piazzolla79414 Fred Hersch: Plays Rodgers & Hammerstein79415 Bill Frisell: Nashville79416 Akiko Yano: Piano Nightly79418 Paul Jacobs: Piano Music79420 Paul Jacobs: Schoenberg: Piano Music79421 Edgard Varèse: Contemporary Chamber Ensemble79422 Zoltán Kodály with Jerry Grossman and Daniel Phillips: Sonata For Solo Cello, Op. 8 / Duo For Violin & Cello, Op. 779423 Jeffrey Kahane: Bach: Partita No. 4 In D Major/Three-Part Inventions (Sinfonias)79424 Arnold Schoenberg with New York Chamber Symphony, Gerard Schwarz and American String Quartet: String Quartet Concerto (After Handel) / Divertimento, Op. 86 (After Couperin)79426 Kurt Weill: Kleine Dreigroschenmusik/Darius Milhaud: La Création du Monde79429 Varttina: Kokko79430 Steve Reich: City Life / Proverb / Nagoya Marimbas79434 Adam Guettel: Floyd Collins79436 John Adams: Music From Nixon In China (reissue)
79437 Original Cast Recording: Girl Crazy79438 Don Byron: Bug Music79439 Richard Goode & Orpheus Chamber Orchestra: Mozart: Piano Concertos Nos. 18 & 2079441 Gipsy Kings: Tierra Gitana: A PBS Music Documentary79442 Philip Glass: Secret Agent79444 Kronos Quartet: The Dream and Prayers of Isaac the Blind79445 Kronos Quartet: Tan Dun: Ghost Opera79446 Alex North: The Bad Seed/Spartacus/A Street Car Named Desire79447 Last Forever: Last Forever79448 Steve Reich: Music For 18 Musicians79449 Joshua Rifkin: The Entertainer: The Very Best of Scott Joplin79451 Steve Reich: Works: 1965-199579452 Richard Goode: Chopin: Polonaise - Fantasie Op. 6179453 John Adams: Earbox79454 Richard Goode & Orpheus Chamber Orchestra: Mozart: Piano Concertos 9 & 2579455 Iva Bittová: Iva Bittová79456 Fred Hersch: Thelonious (Fred Hersch Plays Monk)79457 Kronos Quartet: Early Music79458 Dawn Upshaw: The World So Wide79459 Mandy Patinkin: Mamaloshen79460 Philip Glass: Kundun Soundtrack
79461 Gustavo Santaolalla: Ronroco79462 Gidon Kremer: Piazzolla: El Tango79463 John Adams: I Was Looking at the Ceiling and Then I Saw the Sky79464 Nadja Salerno-Sonnenberg: Humoresque79465 John Adams: Gnarly Buttons / Alleged Dances (Kronos Quartet)
79466 Gipsy Kings: Compas79468 Bill Frisell/Fred Hersch: Songs We Know79469 Astor Piazzolla: Tango Zero Hour79470 Oumou Sangaré: Worotan79471 Cheikh Lô: Ne La Thiass79472 Radio Tarifa: Rumba Argelina79473 John Adams: I Was Looking At The Ceiling And Then I Saw The Sky79474 Paul Jacobs: Preludes For Piano - Books I & II79475 Henry Threadgill: Strange Fruit79476 Afro-Cuban All Stars: A Toda Cuba Le Gusta79477 Rubén González: Introducing...Rubén González79478 Buena Vista Social Club: Buena Vista Social Club79479 Bill Frisell: Gone, Just Like a Train79481 Steve Reich: New York Counterpoint / Eight Lines / Four Organs79482 Audra McDonald: Way Back to Paradise79483 Richard Goode: Bach Partitas79485 John Adams: John's Book of Alleged Dances for String Quartet and Electronics/Gnarly Buttons for Clarinet and Ensemble79486 Philip Glass: Symphony No. 279487 Philip Glass: the CIVIL WarS: The Rome Section - A Tree Is Best Measured When It Is Down79489 Richard Goode & Orpheus Chamber Orchestra: Mozart: Piano Concertos Nos. 23 & 2479490 Kronos Quartet: Caravan79494 Toru Takemitsu: Music from Dodes'ka-den79496 Philip Glass: Symphony No. 2, Interlude From Orphee79497 Sierra Maestra: Tibiri Tabara79498 George Gershwin & Ira Gershwin: Standards & Gems79499 Radio Tarifa: Temporal79500 Kronos Quartet: Alfred Schnittke: Complete String Quartets79501 Afro-Cuban All Stars: Distanto, Differente79503 Rubén González: Chanchullo79504 Kronos Quartet: 25 Years (10-CD Set)
79505 Sérgio & Odair Assad, Nadja Salerno-Sonnenberg: Nadja Salerno-Sonnenberg, Sérgio & Odair Assad79506 Philip Glass: Koyaanisqatsi79508 Mandy Patinkin: Mamaloshen79509 Cesaria Evora: Miss Perfumado79510 Gipsy Kings: Cantos de Amor79512 Paolo Conte: Best of Paolo Conte79515 Astor Piazzolla: The Rough Dancer and the Cyclical Night79516 Astor Piazzolla: La Camorra: The Solitude of Passionate Provocation79517 Compay Segundo: Lo Mejor de la Vida79519 Philip Glass: Koyaanisqatsi79525 Astor Piazzolla: Rough Dancer and the Cyclical Night (Tango Apasionado)79530 Adam Guettel: Myths and Hymns79531 Dawn Upshaw: Sings Vernon Duke79532 Ibrahim Ferrer: Buena Vista Social Club Presents Ibrahim Ferrer79533 Cesaria Evora: Mar Azul79534 Mandy Patinkin: Kidults79536 Bill Frisell: Good Dog, Happy Man79539 Laurie Anderson: Life on a String79541 Gipsy Kings: Volare: The Very Best of the Gipsy Kings79542 Philip Glass: Dracula79545 Dmitry Sitkovetsky: Brahms: Sextet No. 2 / Dohnányi: Serenade79546 Steve Reich/Kronos Quartet: Triple Quartet79549 John Adams: Harmonium79551 Estrellas de Areito: Los Heroes79552 Steve Reich: Reich (Remixed)79553 Michael Gordon: Weather79554 Taraf de Haïdouks: Taraf de Haidouks79557 Caetano Veloso: Livro79558 Fred Hersch: Let Yourself Go (Live at Jordan Hall)79559 Louis Andriessen: Rosa - The Death of a Composer79560 Nico Muhly: Two Boys79567 Afel Bocoum: Alkibar79568 Gidon Kremer: Eight Seasons79569 Ali Farka Touré: Radio Mali79570 Cheikh Lô: Bambay Gueej79572 Los Zafiros: Bossa Cubana79575 Oumou Sangaré: Moussolou79576 Oumou Sangaré: Ko Sira79578 Compay Segundo: Calle Salud79579 Caetano Veloso: Orfeu [Soundtrack]
79580 Audra McDonald: How Glory Goes79581 Philip Glass: Symphony No. 3 / Music From "The Voyage" & "The Civil Wars" / The Light79582 Gidon Kremer: Silencio79583 Bill Frisell: Ghost Town79584 Kronos Quartet: Dracula79586 Chris Thile and Mandoline: Partita Nr.1 in h-moll BWV 1002 / daraus: Double - 4.Satz79596 Audra McDonald: Live at the Donmar, London79597 Devendra Banhart: The Ballad Of Keenan Milton79599 Caetano Veloso: Omaggio A Federico E Giulietta - Ao Vivo79601 Gidon Kremer: Tracing Astor79603 Omara Portuondo: Buena Vista Social Club Presents Omara Portuondo79604 Last Forever: Trainfare Home79605 Dawn Upshaw Sings Bach and Purcell: Angels Hide Their Faces79607 John Adams: Century Rolls79608 Richard Goode & Orpheus Chamber Orchestra: Mozart: Mozart: Piano Concertos Nos. 19 & 2779609 Stephen Sondheim: Saturday Night79611 Kronos Quartet: Requiem for a Dream (Soundtrack; Music by Clint Mansell)
79612 Fred Hersch: Songs Without Words79613 Ingram Marshall: Kingdom Come79614 Duncan Sheik: Phantom Moon79615 Bill Frisell: Blues Dream79616 Emmylou Harris: Red Dirt Girl79617 Youssou N'Dour: Joko (The Link)79618 Philip Glass: Symphony No. 579619 Teresa Sterne: A Portrait79623 Frederic Rzewski: Rzewski Plays Rzewski79624 Bill Frisell: Bill Frisell with Dave Holland and Elvin Jones79625 Sam Phillips: Fan Dance79626 Ricky Ian Gordon: Bright-Eyed Joy79627 Kronos Quartet: Music of Vladimir Martynov 
79628 Brad Mehldau Trio: Ode79629 Radio Tarifa: Cruzando El Río79632 Sérgio & Odair Assad: Sérgio & Odair Assad Play Piazzolla79633 Gidon Kremer: After Mozart79634 John Adams: El Niño79635 Stephen Sondheim: Company79636 John Adams: Naive and Sentimental Music79637 Various: Music From The Motion Picture Big Bad Love79638 Stephen Sondheim: The Frogs / Evening Primrose79639 Kronos Quartet: Requiem for Adam / Terry Riley79640 Wilco: War On War79641 Taraf de Haïdouks: Band Of Gypsies79644 Carmine Coppola & Francis Coppola: Apocalypse Now Redux Soundtrack79645 Audra MacDonald: Private Passions79646 Sam Phillips: Fan Dance: Border Edition79648 Laurie Anderson: Rumba Club79649 Kronos Quartet: Nuevo79650 Ibrahim Ferrer: Buenos Hermanos79652 Bill Frisell: The Willies79653 Robin Holcomb: The Big Time79654 Youssou N'Dour: Coono Du Reer 
79656 Various: Dreamgirls In Concert79657 Gidon Kremer and Kremerata Baltica: Happy Birthday 
79660 Philip Glass: Philip on Film79661 Bill Frisell: The Intercontinentals79662 Steve Reich with Beryl Korot - Three Tales 
79663 Youssou N'Dour: Coono Du Reer (reissue of 79654)
79664 Youssou N'Dour with Pascal Obispo: So Many Men79666 Wilco: More Like The Moon79669 Wilco: Yankee Hotel Foxtrot79670 Samuel Barber, Irving Fine, Elliott Carter and David Diamond: American Music For Strings (Apex)
79671 American String Quartet: Dvorak: String Quartets, Opp. 34 & 51 (Apex)
79672 Zoltan Kodaly: Sonata for Solo Cello (Apex)
79673 Paul Jacobs: Piano Music (Apex)
79674 Claude Debussy: Images, Estampes (Apex)
79675 Schoenberg: String Quartet Concerto (Apex)
79676 David Zinman and the Rochester Philharmonic Orchestra: Dvorak - Ten Legends (Apex)
79677 David Zinman and the Rochester Philharmonic Orchestra: Janáček: Lachian Dances/Dvořák: Suite in A Major (Apex)
79678 Aaron Copland with Boston Symphony Chamber Players and Gilbert Kalish: Sextet/Piano Variations/Piano Quartet (Apex)
79680 Los Angeles Chamber Orchestra and Gerard Schwarz: Idyla (Idyll) For String Orchestra/Mládí (Youth) For Wind Sextet (Apex)
79681 Laurie Anderson: Live in New York79682 Kremerata Baltica: Enescu: String Octet, Op. 7; Piano Quintet in A minor, Op. 2979683 The Magnetic Fields: I79684 Gaby Kerpel: Carnabailito 
79685 Orchestra Baobab: Specialist In All Styles79686 Broadway Revival Cast: Into the Woods79689 Randy Newman: The Randy Newman Songbook Vol. 279690 Mandy Patinkin: Mandy Patinkin Sings Sondheim79691 Ry Cooder and Manuel Galbán: Mambo Sinuendo79692 Lorraine Hunt Lieberson: Bach Cantatas BWV 82 & 19979693 Philip Glass: Music From The Motion Picture The Hours79694 Youssou N'Dour: Egypt79695 Kronos Quartet: Fourth String Quartet79696 Kronos Quartet with Dawn Upshaw: Alban Berg/Lyric Suite 
79697 Kronos Quartet With David Barron: Harry Partch: U.S. Highball79698 Richard Goode: Bach Partitas Nos. 1, 3 & 679699 John Adams: Road Movies79701 Explorer Series: Africa: Ghana: High-Life & Other Popular Music (reissue)
79702 Explorer Series: Africa: Nubia: Escalay (The Water Wheel): Oud Music (Hamza El Din) (reissue)
79703 Explorer Series: Africa: Zimbabwe: The African Mbira / Music of the Shona People (reissue)
79704 Explorer Series: Africa: Zimbabwe: The Soul of Mbira / Traditions of the Shona People (reissue)
79705 Explorer Series: Africa: Animals of Africa: Sounds of the Jungle, Plain & Bush (reissue)
79706 Explorer Series: Africa: Burundi: Music from the Heart of Africa (reissue)
79707 Explorer Series: Africa: East Africa: Ceremonial & Folk Music (reissue)
79708 Explorer Series: Africa: East Africa: Witchcraft & Ritual Music (reissue)
79709 Explorer Series: Africa: West Africa: Drum, Chant & Instrumental Music (reissue)
79710 Explorer Series: Africa: Zimbabwe: Shona Mbira Music (reissue)
79711 Explorer Series: Africa: Ghana: Ancient Ceremonies / Dance Music & Songs (reissue)
79712 Explorer Series: Africa: Burkina Faso: Savannah Rhythms (reissue)
79713 Explorer Series: Africa: Burkina Faso: Rhythms of the Grasslands (reissue)
79714 Explorer Series: Indonesia: Bali: Music from the Morning of the World (reissue)
79715 Explorer Series: South Pacific: Tahiti: The Gauguin Years: Songs and Dances (reissue)
79716 Explorer Series: Indonesia: Bali: Golden Rain (reissue)
79717 Explorer Series: Indonesia: Java: The Jasmine Isle / Gamelan Music (reissue)
79718 Explorer Series: Indonesia: Bali: Music for the Shadow Play (reissue)
79719 Explorer Series: Indonesia: Java: Court Gamelan (reissue)
79720 Explorer Series: Indonesia: Bali: Gamelan Semar Pegulingan / Gamelan of the Love God (reissue)
79721 Explorer Series: Indonesia: Java: Court Gamelan, Volume II (reissue)
79722 Explorer Series: Indonesia: Java: Court Gamelan, Volume III (reissue)
79723 Explorer Series: South Pacific: Island Music (reissue)
79724 Explorer Series: Latin America: Mexico: The Real Mexico in Music and Song (reissue)
79725 Explorer Series: Caribbean: The Bahamas: The Real Bahamas in Music and Song (reissue)
79726 Explorer Series: Caribbean: Trinidad: The Sound of the Sun / The Westland Steel Band (reissue)
79727 Explorer Series: Latin America: Paraguay: Guaraní Songs & Dances (Los Chiriguanos) (reissue)
79728 Explorer Series: Latin America: Peru: Kingdom of the Sun / The Inca Heritage (reissue)
79729 Explorer Series: Latin America: South America: Black Music in Praise of Oxalá and Other Gods (reissue)
79730 Explorer Series: Latin America: Peru: Fiestas: Music of the High Andes (reissue)
79731 Explorer Series: Caribbean: Island Songs and Dances (reissue)
79732 Explorer Series: Latin America: Mexico: Fiestas of Chiapas and Oaxaca (reissue)
79733 Explorer Series: Caribbean: The Bahamas: The Real Bahamas, Volume II (reissue)
79734 Explorer Series: Caribbean: West Indies: An Island Carnival (reissue)
79776 Philip Glass: Mishima (reissue)
79786 Ben Folds and Nick Hornby: Lonely Avenue
79787 Henryk Gorecki: Symphony No. 379793 Explorer Series: Africa: Music from the Nonesuch Explorer Series79794 Explorer Series: Indonesia: Music from the Nonesuch Explorer Series79801 Michael Gordon: Light Is Calling79803 Gidon Kremer & Kremerata Baltica: The Russian Seasons79804 Kronos Quartet: Mugam Sayagi, Music of Franghiz Ali-Zadeh79805 Emmylou Harris: Stumble Into Grace79807 Sam Phillips: A Boot and a Shoe79808 Caetano Veloso: The Best of Caetano Veloso79809 Wilco: A ghost is born79810 Manuel "Guajiro" Mirabal: Buena Vista Social Club Presents Manuel 'Guajiro' Mirabal79811 Omara Portuondo: Flor de amor79812 Dawn Upshaw: Voices of Light79813 Punch-Drunk Love Soundtrack
79814 Bali: Gamelan and Kecak
79815 West Java: Sundanese Jaipong
79816 John Adams: On the Transmigration of Souls79817 Joni Mitchell: Travelogue79818 Paolo Conte: Rêveries79819 Viktor Krauss: Far From Enough79821 Youssou N'Dour with Joy Denalane: So Many Men79822 Radio Tarifa: Fiebre79823 Caetano Veloso: A Foreign Sound79826 David Byrne: Grown Backwards79827 Oumou Sangare: oumou79828 Bill Frisell: Unspeakable79829 Adam Guettel: The Light in the Piazza79830 Stephen Sondheim: Bounce79831 Richard Goode: Mozart79832 Joshua Rifkin: The Baroque Beatles Book79835 Steve Reich and Beryl Korot: Three Tales (w/ DVD)
79836 Anner Bylsma and Malcolm Bilson: Beethoven: Cello Sonata No 3 in A Major, Op. 69: 3rd mvt.79837 Thomas Newman: Angels in America Soundtrack
79838 George Balanchine: Choreography by Balanchine - Tzigane / Andante, Divertimento No. 15 / The Four Temperaments / Selections from Jewels / Stravinsky Violin Concerto (DVD)
79839 George Balanchine: Choreography by Balanchine - Chaconne / Prodigal Son / Ballo della Regina / The Steadfast Tin Soldier / Elégie / Tschaikovsky Pas de Deux (DVD)
79841 Gipsy Kings: Roots79842 Youssou N'Dour: Egypt (reissue)
79843 Richard Goode: Johann Sebastian Bach: Partita nr 4 D-dur BVW 82879844 The Magnetic Fields: I Thought You Were My Boyfriend (Remixes by Rob Rives)79846 Brian Wilson: SMiLE79847 k.d. lang: Hymns of the 49th Parallel79852 Rokia Traoré: Bowmboï79853 Brad Mehldau: Live in Tokyo79854 Laura Veirs: Carbon Glacier79856 Kronos Quartet & Asha Bhosle: You've Stolen My Heart: Songs from R.D. Burman's Bollywood79857 John Adams: The Dharma at Big Sur / My Father Knew Charles Ives79860 Stephin Merritt: Pieces of April (Soundtrack)
79862 Audra McDonald: Build a Bridge79863 Bill Frisell: East/West79864 Joshua Redman Elastic Band: Momentum79866 SFJAZZ Collective: SFJAZZ Collective79873 Fire Snakes: Year of Meteors79876 Pat Metheny: The Way Up79877 Ry Cooder: Chávez Ravine79880 Angelo Badalamenti: A Very Long Engagement79882 Ali Farka Touré: Red & Green79884 Brian Wilson: Good Vibrations / In Blue Hawaii79886 Kremerata Baltica and Gidon Kremer: Mozart: Violin Concerto No.4 in D major, K.21879887 Louis Andriessen: Writing to Vermeer79891 Steve Reich: You Are (Variations)79892 Wilco: A Ghost Is Born79893 Laura Veirs: Year of Meteors79894 Brian Eno & David Byrne: My Life in the Bush of Ghosts79897 Bill Frisell: Bill Frisell, Ron Carter, Paul Motian79899 Stephin Merritt: Showtunes79901 Kronos Quartet: The Fountain (Soundtrack; Music by Clint Mansell)
79902 Jeff Tweedy: Sunken Treasure: Live in the Pacific Northwest (DVD)
79903 Wilco: Kicking Television: Live in Chicago79910 Brad Mehldau Trio: Day Is Done79911 Brad Mehldau Trio: House on Hill79912 Amadou & Mariam: Dimanche à Bamako79913 Bill Frisell: Further East / Further West79914 Brian Wilson: SMiLE (HDCD)
79918 Pat Metheny & Ornette Coleman: Song X: 20th Anniversary79920 Ali Farka Touré & Toumani Diabaté: In the Heart of the Moon79925 Kate & Anna McGarrigle: The McGarrigle Christmas Hour79927 Glenn Kotche: Mobile79929 Laura Veirs: Galaxies79930 SFJAZZ Collective: SFJAZZ Collective 279933 Kenny Garrett: Beyond the Wall79934 Various Artists: Our New Orleans79937 Shawn Colvin: These Four Walls79938 Cheikh Lô: Lamp Fall79940 Pat Metheny: Letter from Home79941 Pat Metheny: The Road to You79943 Stephin Merritt: The Orphan of Zhao79944 Stephin Merritt: Peach Blossom Fan79945 Stephin Merritt: My Life As a Fairy Tale79946 Stephen Sondheim: Sweeney Todd (2006 Broadway Cast Recording)79948 Pat Metheny: Still Life (Talking)79949 k.d. lang: Watershed79951 Stephin Merritt: The Gothic Archies: The Tragic Treasury79952 Brad Mehldau: Love Sublime (with Renée Fleming)79953 Toumani Diabaté: Boulevard de l'Indépendance79954 Lorraine Hunt Lieberson: Neruda Songs79955 Pat Metheny: We Live Here79956 Pat Metheny: Quartet79959 Gipsy Kings: Pasajero79961 Ry Cooder: My Name Is Buddy79962 Steve Reich: Phases (5-CD Set)79964 Pat Metheny & Brad Mehldau: Metheny Mehldau79964 Ali Farka Touré: Savane79966 Scritti Politti: White Bread Black Beer79967 The Black Keys: Magic Potion79969 Kremerata Baltica, Gidon Kremer: Pelecis: Flowering Jasmine79974 The Black Keys: Your Touch: The EP79981 Caetano Veloso: Cê79984 Wilco: Sky Blue Sky
79987 Various Artists: The Nonesuch Collection, Vol. 179988 Steve Reich: Reich: Remixed (2006)79989 Randy Newman: Harps and Angels79990 Shawn Colvin: Let It Slide79993 Henryk Górecki & Kronos Quartet: Henryk Górecki: String Quartet No. 3 ('...songs are sung')79994 Sevendust: Alpha79995 Calico: [Chopped & Screwed]
79997 Payroll: Money, Mack and Murder79999 Lil Bootie and Webbie: Survival Of The Fittest85502 Compay Segundo: Las Flores de la VidaNon-sequential numbering
104188 Pat Metheny & Brad Mehldau: Quartet104252 Joshua Redman: Back East104316 Laura Veirs: Saltbreakers105084 Laurie Anderson: Homeland110460 k.d. lang: Watershed122620: Joni Mitchell & Various Artists: A Tribute to Joni Mitchell122812 Randy Newman: Harps and Angels130364 Explorer Series: East Asia: Japan: Shakuhachi Music / A Bell Ringing in the Empty Sky130428 Laurie Anderson: Big Science (reissue)131388 Wilco: Sky Blue Sky139068 Ibrahim Ferrer: Mi Sueño139132 Various Artists: World Circuit Presents171644 Wilco: Sky Blue Sky (Deluxe CD + DVD)181732 Punch Brothers: Punch192572 Pat Metheny: Secret Story254652 Christina Courtin: Christina Courtin257020 Sam Phillips: Don't Do Anything257084 Fernando Otero: Pagina de Buenos Aires266044 Youssou N'Dour: Rokku Mi Rokka (Give and Take)278140 Sérgio & Odair Assad: Jardim abandonado287228 Gidon Kremer & Kremerata Baltica: De Profundis292476 The Black Keys: Attack & Release305852 Mark Morris Dance Group: The Hard Nut (DVD)307452 Kronos Quartet: Plays Sigur Rós310140 Shawn Colvin: Live327036 The Magnetic Fields: Distortion327100 John Adams: A Flowering Tree356540 Stephen Sondheim: Sweeney Todd (2007 Film Soundtrack) (Highlights)360508 Kronos Quartet: Terry Riley: The Cusp of Magic368572 Stephen Sondheim: Sweeney Todd (2007 Film Soundtrack) (Deluxe Edition)369020 Jonny Greenwood: There Will Be Blood369796 Various Artists: " … and all the pieces matter": Five Years of Music from "The Wire"376252 Brad Mehldau Trio: Live376828 Pat Metheny: Day Trip396732 Various Artists: Beyond Hamsterdam: Baltimore Tracks from "The Wire"406780 Steve Reich: Daniel Variations406908 k.d. lang: Watershed (Deluxe Edition)424508 Philip Glass: Glass Box: A Nonesuch Retrospective433724 Toumani Diabaté: The Mandé Variations433788 Orchestra Baobab: Made in Dakar435964 Bill Frisell: History, Mystery439100 Nicholas Payton: Into the Blue450300 T Bone Burnett: Tooth of Crime451644 Wilco: Ashes of American Flags (DVD)
465532 Rokia Traoré: Tchamantché467580 Pat Metheny: Tokyo Day Trip: Live EP467708 Alarm Will Sound: a/rhythmia468220 John Adams: Doctor Atomic Symphony478524 Bill Frisell: Disfarmer480380 Allen Toussaint: The Bright Mississippi480444 Emmylou Harris: All I Intended to Be480508 Richard Goode: Beethoven: The Complete Piano Concertos510844 Joshua Redman: Compass510893 Elliott Carter: A Nonesuch Retrospective511487 Isabel Bayrakdarian: Gomidas Songs511494 Pat Metheny: Question and Answer511495 Jim Hall & Pat Metheny: Jim Hall & Pat Metheny511496 Pat Metheny: Upojenie511762 Ry Cooder: I, Flathead512393 The Magnetic Fields: Please Stop Dancing EP (MP3s)512396 John Adams: Hallelujah Junction: A Nonesuch Retrospective512586 Chris Thile & Edgar Meyer: Edgar Meyer and Chris Thile512789 Gidon Kremer & Kremerata Baltica: Mozart: The Complete Violin Concertos513702 Caetano Veloso & David Byrne: Live at Carnegie Hall514400 Chris Thile & Edgar Meyer: Edgar Meyer and Chris Thile (Deluxe CD + DVD)514415 Buena Vista Social Club: Buena Vista Social Club at Carnegie Hall515783 Gidon Kremer & Astor Piazzolla: Hommage à Piazzolla: The Complete Astor Piazzolla Recordings (8-CD Set)
516092 Bill Frisell: The Best of Bill Frisell, Vol. 1: Folk Songs516276 The Black Keys: Live at the Crystal Ballroom (DVD)
516608 Wilco: Wilco (the album)516668 Pat Metheny: Orchestrion516987 Sara Watkins: Sara Watkins516995 Carolina Chocolate Drops: Genuine Negro Jig517129 Brad Mehldau Trio: The Art of the Trio Recordings: 1996–2001517241 Dan Auerbach: Keep It Hid517387 Thomas Newman: Revolutionary Road (Soundtrack)
517673 Amadou & Mariam: Welcome to Mali517766 Audra McDonald: Go Back Home517795 Pat Metheny: One Quiet Night517948 Joshua Rifkin: The Baroque Beatles Book518043 Bill Evans: Turn Out the Stars: The Final Village Vanguard Recordings, June 1980518084 Wilco: A.M. (LP + CD)
518085 Wilco: Being There (2LP)
518086 Wilco: Summerteeth (2LP)
518349 Kronos Quartet: Floodplain518654 Rokia Traoré: Zen (live)518655 Brad Mehldau: Highway Rider518940 Stephen Sondheim: Road Show519237 Pat Metheny: Day Trip / Tokyo Day Trip (LP + CD)
519480 Emmylou Harris: Wrecking Ball (2014 CD/DVD reissue)
519594 The Magnetic Fields: Realism519598 The Low Anthem: Oh My God, Charlie Darwin519646 Björk: Voltaïc: Songs from the Volta Tour519647 Björk: Voltaïc: Songs from the Volta Tour (Deluxe)519650  Oumou Sangaré: Seya519787 Gilbert Kalish: Joseph Haydn: Piano Music, Volume I520266 The Black Keys: Brothers520275 Brad Mehldau: Live in Marciac (2CD + DVD)
520659 Björk: Voltaïc: The Volta Mixes521074 Tony Allen: Secret Agent521980 Punch Brothers: Antifogmatic522298 David Byrne & Fatboy Slim: Here Lies Love522300 David Byrne & Fatboy Slim: Here Lies Love (Deluxe Edition)
522301 Natalie Merchant: Selections from the Album "Leave Your Sleep"522304 Natalie Merchant: Leave Your Sleep522413 Timo Andres: Shy and Mighty522415 Caetano Veloso: zii e zie522814 Youssou N'Dour: I Bring What I Love (Soundtrack)
522937 Ali Farka Touré & Toumani Diabaté: Ali and Toumani523014 John Adams: Son of Chamber Symphony / String Quartet523142 Billy Bragg & Wilco: Mermaid Avenue523143 Billy Bragg & Wilco: Mermaid Avenue Vol. II523268 k.d. lang: Recollection523278 k.d. lang: Recollection (Deluxe Edition)
523488 Stephen Sondheim: A Little Night Music523691 The Low Anthem: Smart Flesh523775 The Low Anthem: Charlie Darwin (7" Single)
523942 Wilco: Kicking Television: Live in Chicago (LP Box Set)
523994 The Black Keys: Brothers (Deluxe Edition)
524056 Punch Brothers: Antifogmatic (Deluxe Edition)
524117 Vinicio Capossela: The Story-Faced Man524138 Rhys Chatham: A Crimson Grail524282 Laurie Anderson: Only an Expert (12" Vinyl Single)
524520 Randy Newman: Live in London (CD + DVD)
524842 John Adams: I Am Love (Soundtrack)524853 Steve Reich: Double Sextet / 2×5524876 Ben Folds & Nick Hornby: Lonely Avenue524877 Ben Folds & Nick Hornby: Lonely Avenue (Deluxe Edition)
525261 Philip Selway: Familial525263 Wanda Jackson: The Party Ain't Over525874 k.d. lang & The Siss Boom Bang: Sing it Loud525943 Randy Newman: Songbook Vol. 2525966 Emmylou Harris: Hard Bargain525993 AfroCubism: AfroCubism526130 Carolina Chocolate Drops & Luminescent Orchestrii: Carolina Chocolate Drops / Luminescent Orchestrii526176 Björk: The Comet Song (iTunes Exclusive)
526294 James Farm: James Farm526609 Jessica Lea Mayfield: Tell Me526752 Carter Burwell: True Grit (Soundtrack)526880 Jonny Greenwood: Norwegian Wood (Soundtrack)527011 Amadou & Mariam: Remixes527063 Donnacha Dennehy:Grá agus Bás527267 Kate & Anna McGarrigle: Tell My Sister527269 Cheikh Lô: Jamm527407 Ry Cooder: Pull Up Some Dust and Sit Down527603 Chris Thile & Michael Daves: Sleep with One Eye Open527912 Pat Metheny: What's It All About527957 Steve Reich: 2×5 Remixed528236 Steve Reich: WTC 9/11 / Mallet Quartet / Dance Patterns528371 Brad Mehldau & Kevin Hays & Patrick Zimmerli: Modern Music528673 Björk: The Crystalline Series: Serban Ghenea Mixes528728 Björk: Biophilia528733 Philip Selway: Running Blind (EP)
528982 Gidon Kremer & Kremerata Baltica: The Art of Instrumentation: Homage to Glenn Gould529007 Fatoumata Diawara: Kanou529099 The Black Keys: El Camino529103 The Black Keys: Lonely Boy529689 Brad Mehldau Trio: Ode529776 Kronos Quartet: Music of Vladimir Martynov529777 Punch Brothers: Who's Feeling Young Now?529809 Carolina Chocolate Drops: Leaving Eden529832 The Low Anthem: Smart Flesh (Extras) (EP)
529926 Billy Bragg & Wilco: Mermaid Avenue: The Complete Sessions530223 Krzysztof Penderecki & Jonny Greenwood: Threnody for the Victims of Hiroshima / Popcorn Superhet Receiver / Polymorphia / 48 Responses to Polymorphia530280 Amadou & Mariam: Dougou Badia (EP)
530395 Dr. John: Locked Down530403 Amadou & Mariam: Folila530526 Sara Watkins: You're the One I Love (7" Single)
530562 Jeremy Denk: Ligeti/Beethoven530682 Shawn Colvin: All Fall Down530684 Sara Watkins: Sun Midnight Sun530858 Sam Amidon: Bright Sunny South531159 Ry Cooder: Election Special531209 Fatoumata Diawara: Fatou531257 Pat Metheny: Unity Band531450 The Black Keys: Tour Rehearsal Tapes531819 Lianne La Havas: Is Your Love Big Enough?531821 Pat Metheny: The Orchestrion Project532029 Brad Mehldau Trio: Where Do You Start532288 Joshua Redman: Walking Shadows532291 John Adams: Nixon in China (Metropolitan Opera; Blu-ray / DVD)
532292 Jonny Greenwood: The Master (Soundtrack)532559 Jonny Greenwood: The Master (Soundtrack) (LP + CD)
533294 Punch Brothers: Ahoy! (EP)
533400 Nataly Dawn: How I Knew Her534285 Emmylou Harris & Rodney Crowell: Old Yellow Moon534291 Bombino: Nomad534416 Timo Andres: Home Stretch534452 Devendra Banhart: Mala534456 Iron and Wine: Ghost on Ghost534585 Ry Cooder & Corridos Famosos: Live in San Francisco534863 Rokia Traoré: Beautiful Africa534867 Various Artists: Inside Llewyn Davis (Soundtrack)
534872 Various Artists: Sing Me the Songs: Celebrating the Works of Kate McGarrigle535064 Bombino: Azamane Tiliade / Si Chilan (10" Single)
535356 Jeremy Denk: J.S. Bach: Goldberg Variations CD+DVD
535352 Pat Metheny: Tap: John Zorn’s Book of Angels, Vol. 20535360 Chris Thile: Bach: Sonatas and Partitas, Vol. 1536077 Billy Bragg & Wilco: Mermaid Avenue Vol. III536354 Pat Metheny Unity Group: Kin (←→)536374 Various Artists: Inside Llewyn Davis (Soundtrack) (LP)
536376 Sam Amidon: Bright Sunny South (LP + Bonus 7")
536377 Chris Thile: Bach: Sonata No. 1 in G Minor / Partita No. 1 in B Minor (LP)
536645 Brad Mehldau & Mark Guiliana: Mehliana: Taming the Dragon536951 Kronos Quartet: Kronos Explorer Series536952 Kronos Quartet: A Thousand Thoughts537579 David Byrne & Fatboy Slim: Here Lies Love: Original Cast Recording540989 Jacob Cooper: Silver Threads541042 Natalie Merchant: Natalie Merchant541356 John Adams: City Noir / Saxophone Concerto performed by St. Louis Symphony, led by David Robertson, featuring saxophonist Timothy McAllister
541364 Caetano Veloso: Abraçaço541708 Rhiannon Giddens: Tomorrow Is My Turn541711 Olivia Chaney: The Longest River541777 Various Artists: Another Day, Another Time: Celebrating the Music of "Inside Llewyn Davis"541941 Nico Muhly: Two Boys541944 Nickel Creek: A Dotted Line541970 Emmylou Harris: Wrecking Ball [LP]
541997 Louis Andriessen: La Commedia542164 Clint Mansell: Noah: Music from the Motion Picture (feat. Kronos Quartet)
542300 The Black Keys: Turn Blue542939 Toumani Diabaté & Sidiki Diabaté: Toumani & Sidiki543123 Steve Reich: Radio Rewrite performed by Alarm Will Sound, Jonny Greenwood, Vicky Chow
543642 Sam Amidon: Lily-O543671 Wilco: What's Your 20? Essential Tracks 1994–2014543674 Wilco: Alpha Mike Foxtrot: Rare Tracks 1994–2014 [LP]
543675 Wilco: Alpha Mike Foxtrot: Rare Tracks 1994–2014543970 Various Artists: Boyhood: Music from the Motion Picture543973 Robert Plant: Lullaby and... The Ceaseless Roar544735 Chris Thile & Edgar Meyer: Bass & Mandolin545186 James Farm: City Folk545979 Various Artists: Another Day, Another Time: Celebrating the Music of "Inside Llewyn Davis" [LP]
546377 Punch Brothers: The Phosphorescent Blues546521 Tigran Hamasyan: Mockroot546360 Abelardo Barroso with Orquesta Sensación: Cha Cha Cha546900 Jonny Greenwood + Various Artists: Inherent Vice: Original Motion Picture Soundtrack547343 Punch Brothers: The Phosphorescent Blues [LP]
547466 Tyondai Braxton: HIVE1548238 The Staves: If I Was548243 Emmylou Harris & Rodney Crowell: The Traveling Kind548606 Buena Vista Social Club: Lost and Found548920 The Bad Plus Joshua Redman: The Bad Plus Joshua Redman548925 Kronos Quartet: One Earth, One People, One Love: Kronos Plays Terry Riley549103 Brad Mehldau: 10 Years Solo Live [8-LP set]
549311 Mbongwana Star: From Kinshasa549523 Kronos Quartet: Sunrise of the Planetary Dream Collector: Music of Terry Riley549570 Henryk Górecki: Symphony No. 4549801 Natalie Merchant: Paradise Is There: The New Tigerlily Recordings549857 The Arcs: Yours, Dreamily,550000 Lianne La Havas: Blood550182 St Germain: St Germain550588 Henryk Górecki: A Nonesuch Retrospective [7-CD set]
551822 Rhiannon Giddens: Factory Girl [EP]
551913 Lake Street Dive: Side Pony552027 Laurie Anderson: Heart of a Dog soundtrack
552317 The Arcs: The Arcs vs. The Inventors, Vol. I [EP]
552641 Shye Ben Tzur, Jonny Greenwood, and The Rajasthan Express: Junun552785 Punch Brothers: The Wireless [EP]
553323 Mariza: Mundo553734 Michael Daves: Orchids and Violence553787 Clint Mansell featuring Kronos Quartet: Requiem for a Dream Soundtrack [LP]
554246 Michael Daves: Violence and Orchids [LP]
554569 Pat Metheny: The Unity Sessions554650 Cuong Vu Trio & Pat Metheny: Cuong Vu Trio Meets Pat Metheny554644 Allen Toussaint: American Tunes554678 Brad Mehldau Trio: Blues and Ballads554796 Joshua Redman & Brooklyn Rider: Sun on Sand composed and arranged by Patrick Zimmerli
555078 Caetano Veloso & Gilberto Gil: Dois Amigos, Um Século de Música: Multishow Live555845 Joshua Redman & Brad Mehldau: Nearness556120 Berg: Lulu (Metropolitan Opera production; Blu-ray / DVD)
556250 Devendra Banhart: Ape in Pink Marble556491 Conor Oberst: Ruminations556783 Nico Muhly & Teitur: Confessions557170 John Adams: Scheherazade.2 performed by St. Louis Symphony, led by David Robertson, featuring violinist Leila Josefowicz
558154 The Magnetic Fields: 50 Song Memoir558563 Randy Newman: Dark Matter558592 Conor Oberst: Salutations558638 Offa Rex (The Decemberists & Olivia Chaney): The Queen of Hearts558771 Chris Thile & Brad Mehldau: Chris Thile & Brad Mehldau558777 Fleet Foxes: Crack-Up
558805 Rhiannon Giddens: Freedom Highway558933 Yo-Yo Ma, Chris Thile, Edgar Meyer: Bach Trios559114 Tigran Hamasyan: An Ancient Observer559151 Kronos Quartet with Sam Amidon, Olivia Chaney, Rhiannon Giddens, Natalie Merchant: Folk Songs559638 Sam Amidon: The Following Mountain561604 Natalie Merchant: The Natalie Merchant Collection561784 Louis Andriessen: Theatre of the World with Los Angeles Philharmonic
562756 John Adams: Violin Concerto with Leila Josefowicz, St. Louis Symphony
562886 Rostam: Half-Light563057 Robert Plant: Catch Fire563508 Brad Mehldau Trio Seymour Reads the Constitution!563777 Fleet Foxes: The Electric Lady Session (Record Store Day: Black Friday 10")
564004 Camille: OUÏ (US only)
564053 The Staves & yMusic: The Way Is Read564164 Laurie Anderson & Kronos Quartet: Landfall564711 Chris Thile: Thanks for Listening564777 Jonny Greenwood: Phantom Thread Soundtrack
565047 Joshua Redman, Ron Miles, Scott Colley, Brian Blade: Still Dreaming565456 Tigran Hamasyan: For Gyumri EP
565676 Steve Reich: Pulse/Quartet w/International Contemporary Ensemble & Colin Currie Group
565710 David Byrne: American Utopia565982 Brad Mehldau: After Bach563316 Jeremy Denk: c. 1300–c. 2000566773 John Adams: Doctor Atomic567158 Lake Street Dive: Free Yourself Up567191 Olivia Chaney: Shelter567405 Thomas Bartlett & Nico Muhly: Peter Pears: Balinese Ceremonial Music567597 The Staves: Pine Hollow EP
570726 Mandy Patinkin: Diary: January 27, 2018571525 Gabriel Kahane: Book of Travelers571699 Fleet Foxes: First Collection 2006–2009571939 Mountain Man: Magic Ship574181 True Stories, A Film By David Byrne: The Complete Soundtrack574344 Mandy Patinkin: Diary: April/May 2018587444 Caroline Shaw / Attacca Quartet: Orange (released with New Amsterdam Records)
574824 David Byrne: American Utopia (Deluxe Edition)585191 Emmylou Harris: The Studio Albums 1980-83585291 Joshua Redman Quartet: Come What May585867 Brad Mehldau: Finding Gabriel587754 Daniel Wohl: Melt587972 Kronos Quartet: Terry Riley: Sun Rings590870 Daughter of Swords: Dawnbreaker590958 Gaby Moreno & Van Dyke Parks: ¡Spangled!591092 William Brittelle: Spiritual America (released with New Amsterdam Records)
591336 Rhiannon Giddens with Francesco Turrisi: there is no Other591592 The Black Keys: "Let's Rock"591517 Alarm Will Sound: Donnacha Dennehy: The Hunger595950 Mandy Patinkin: Diary: December 2018596317 Pat Metheny: From This Place599090 Mandy Patinkin: Children and Art599099 Rachael & Vilray: Rachael & Vilray599193 Devendra Banhart: Ma599197 Vagabon: Vagabon599661 Carminho: Maria604496 Sam Amidon: Fatal Flower Garden EP (A Tribute to Harry Smith)604600 David Byrne: American Utopia on Broadway Original Cast Recording
607283 Jeff Parker: Max Brown single
624971 Jeff Parker: Suite for Max Brown624982 Dave Malloy: Octet'' Original Cast Recording

References

External links
Nonesuch Records website

Discographies of American record labels
Nonesuch Records